= 1988–89 FC Swarovski Tirol season =

Swarovski Tirol
1988–89 season
- Manager: Ernst Happel
- Stadium: Tivoli-Stadion Innsbruck
- Bundesliga: 1st
- ÖFB-Cup: Winners
- Intertoto Cup: Group stage
- Top goalscorer: League: Peter Pacult (26 goals); All: Peter Pacult (38 goals)
- Biggest win: 11–0 v. Admira Dornbirn (A); 15 August 1988
- Biggest defeat: 1–5 v. First Vienna (A); 6 August 1988

During the 1988-89 Austrian football season, FC Swarovski Tirol participated in the Austrian Football Bundesliga and the Austrian Cup, winning the double. They also participated in the Intertoto Cup. It was also the third consecutive season in the club's existence.

== Squad ==
Note: Flags indicate national team as defined under FIFA eligibility rules; some limited exceptions apply. Players may hold more than one non-FIFA nationality.

No.	Pos.	Nation	Player
—	GK	AUT	Martin Immler
—	GK	AUT	Klaus Lindenberger
—	DF	AUT	Kurt Garger
—	DF	AUT	Alfred Jirausek
—	DF	YUG	Ivica Kalinić
—	DF	AUT	Leo Lainer
—	DF	AUT	Bruno Pezzey
—	DF	AUT	Michael Streiter
—	DF	AUT	Robert Wazinger
—	MF	AUT	Thomas Eder
—	MF	AUT	Alfred Hörtnagl
—	MF	AUT	Peter Hrstic
—	MF	AUT	Manfred Linzmaier
—	MF	AUT	Werner Löberbauer
—	MF	GER	Hansi Müller
—	MF	AUT	Heinz Peischl
—	MF	AUT	Manfred Schneider

No.	Pos.	Nation	Player
—	FW	AUT	Rupert Marko
—	FW	AUT	Peter Pacult
—	FW	AUT	Christoph Westerthaler

== Competitions ==
=== Overall record ===
Competition	First match	Last match	Starting round	Final position	Record							
Competition	First match	Last match	Starting round	Final position	Pld	W	D	L	GF	GA	GD	Win %
Bundesliga	22 July 1988	9 June 1989	Matchday 1	Winners	36	24	7	5	78	38	+40	66.67
Austrian Cup	15 August 1988	23 May 1989	Second round	Winners	7	6	0	1	27	6	+21	85.71
Intertoto Cup	25 June 1988	16 July 1988	Group stage	Fourth place	6	2	1	3	10	16	−6	33.33
Total					49	32	8	9	115	60	+55	65.31

=== Bundesliga ===
22 July 1988 1	Swarovski Tirol	1-0	Sturm Graz	Tivoli Stadion, Innsbruck
19:30	Müller 24'			Attendance: 10,000; Referee: Robert Sedlace

26 July 1988 2	Rapid Wien	1-0	Swarovski Tirol	Gerhard-Hanappi-Stadion, Vienna
19:30	Herzog 32'			Attendance: 9,000; Referee: Helmut Kohl

30 July 1988 3	Swarovski Tirol	2-0	Admira Wacker	Tivoli Stadion, Innsbruck
16:00	Pacult 33' (pen.); Pezzey 41'			Attendance: 11,000; Referee: Rudolf Finzinger

6 August 1988 4	First Vienna	5-1	Swarovski Tirol	Hohe Warte Stadium, Vienna
16:00	Peter 18', 45'; Slezak 37'; Heraf 48'; Drabits 51'		Pacult 73'	Attendance: 2,700; Referee: Hubert Forstinger

12 August 1988 5	Swarovski Tirol	4-0	LASK Linz	Tivoli Stadion, Innsbruck
19:30	Lainer 13'; Westerthaler 56'; Hristic 61'; Marko 80'			Attendance: 6,500; Referee: Franz Bogendorfer

20 August 1988 6	Grazer AK	0-3	Swarovski Tirol	GAK-Platz, Graz
16:00	Lainer 19'; Marko 60'; Pacult 90'			Attendance: 4,000; Referee: Friedrich Kaupe

23 August 1988 7	Swarovski Tirol	3-1	Austria Wien	Tivoli Stadion, Innsbruck
19:30	Müller 42' (pen.); Löberbauer 77'; Linzmaier 80'		Ogris 46'	Attendance: 12,000; Referee: Heinz Holzmann

27 August 1988 8	Vorwärts Steyr	0-5	Swarovski Tirol	Vorwärts-Stadion, Steyr
16:00			Westerthaler 20', 32', 70'; Pacult 75'; Linzmaier 90+1'	Attendance: 8,000; Referee: Roman Steindl

3 September 1988 9	Swarovski Tirol	1-3	Wiener Sport-Club	Stadion Lehen, Salzburg
16:00	Garger 7'		Gretschnig 30'; Abfalterer 62'; Keglevits 78'	Attendance: 12,000; Referee: Josef Spitzl

10 September 1988 10	St. Pölten	1-3	Swarovski Tirol	Voith-Platz, St. Pölten
16:00	Kempes 63' (pen.)		Pacult 22'; Westertahler 74', 79'	Attendance: 10,000; Referee: Hubert Forstinger

16 September 1988 11	Swarovski Tirol	5-1	Austria Klagenfurt	Tivoli Stadion, Innsbruck
19:30	Pezzey 10'; Pacult 20', 75'; Westerthaler 45'; Garger 72'		Koreimann 36'	Attendance: 5,000; Referee: Heinz Holzmann

23 September 1988 12	Austria Klagenfurt	0-1	Swarovski Tirol	Wörthersee Stadion, Klagenfurt
19:30			Hrstic 28' (o.g.)	Attendance: 2,800; Referee: Friedrich Kaupe

30 September 1988 13	Swarovski Tirol	4-2	St. Pölten	Tivoli Stadion, Innsbruck
19:30	Pacult 32', 90+3'; Westerthaler 40'; Garger 76'		Zach 71'; Kempes 90+4' (pen.)	Attendance: 16,000; Referee: Helmut Kohl

8 October 1988 14	Wiener Sport-Club	4-0	Swarovski Tirol	Sportclub-Platz, Vienna
15:00	Reisinger 34'; Keglevits 38', 55', 77'			Attendance: 3,000; Referee: Rudolf Finzinger

11 October 1988 15	Swarovski Tirol	3-0	Vorwärts Steyr	Tivol Stadion, Innsbruck
19:30	Linzmaier 6'; Pezzey 55'; Pacult 81' (pen.)			Attendance: 5,000; Referee: Günther Lindner

22 October 1988 16	Austria Wien	2-2	Swarovski Tirol	Praterstadion, Vienna
15:00	Prohaska 23', 88'		Westerthaler 65'; Peischl 75'	Attendance: 5,000; Referee: Helmut Kohl

13 September 1988 17	Swarovski Tirol	0-0	Grazer AK	Tivoli Stadion, Innsbruck
19:30				Attendance: 6,500; Referee: Roman Steindl

5 November 1988 18	LASK Linz	1-1	Swarovski Tirol	Linzer Stadion, Linz
15:00	Roth 25'		Hörtnagl 71'	Attendance: 2,700; Referee: Udo Kratzer

12 November 1988 19	Swarovski Tirol	2-0	First Vienna	Tivoli Stadion, Innsbruck
15:00	Lainer 26'; Linzmaier 57'			Attendance: 9,000; Referee: Gerd Adanitsch

19 November 1988 20	Admira Wacker	3-4	Swarovski Tirol	Bundesstadion, Maria Enzersdorf
15:00	Rodax 11'; Schaub 56'; Knaller 84'		Peischl 5'; Linzmaier 63', 76'; Müller 82'	Attendance: 9,500; Referee: Horst Brummeier

26 November 1988 21	Swarovski Tirol	3-1	Rapid Wien	Tivoli Stadion, Innsbruck
15:00	Pacult 8', 88'; Westerthaler 82'		Wallner 84'	Attendance: 16,000; Referee: Hubert Forstinger

4 December 1988 22	Sturm Graz	0-2	Swarovski Tirol	Liebenau Stadion, Graz
10:30			Pacult 53', 62'	Attendance: 2,500; Referee: Robert Sedlacek

11 March 1989 23	Grazer AK	0-1	Swarovski Tirol	GAK-Platz, Graz
16:00			Lainer 47'	Attendance: 7,000; Referee: Gerhard Benedek

18 March 1989 24	Swarovski Tirol	2-0	Austria Wien	Tivoli Stadion, Innsbruck
16:00	Lainer 46', 83'			Attendance: 17,000; Referee: Heinz Holzmann

28 March 1989 25	Admira Wacker	0-1	Swarovski Tirol	Bundesstadion, Maria Enzersdorf
19:00			Pacult 80'	Attendance: 14,000; Referee: Helmut Kohl

1 April 1989 26	Swarovski Tirol	1-1	First Vienna	Tivoli Stadion, Innsbruck
16:00	Müller 47'		Glatzmayer 75'	Attendance: 13,000; Referee: Dr. Gerhard Kapl

8 April 1989 27	Swarovski Tirol	2-1	Wiener Sport-Club	Tivoli Stadion, Innsbruck
16:00	Westerthaler 41'; Pacult 79'		Keglevits 57'	Attendance: 10,000; Referee: Günther Lindner

15 April 1989 28	Rapid Wien	2-3	Swarovski Tirol	Gerhard-Hanappi-Stadion, Vienna
16:00	Coquito 73'; Kienast 74'		Lainer 43'; Pacult 56'; Hörtnagl 61'	Attendance: 5,500; Referee: Horst Brummeier

21 April 1989 29	Swarovski Tirol	3-2	St. Pölten	Tivoli Stadion, Innsbruck
19:30	Pacult 28'; Kalinic 44'; Westerthaler 58'		Rotter 63' (pen.), 88' (pen.)	Attendance: 9,000; Referee: Martin Rupitsch

28 April 1988 30	St. Pölten	0-0	Swarovski Tirol	VOITH-Platz, St. Pölten
19:00				Attendance: 4,800; Referee: Alfred Wieser

5 May 1989 31	Swarovski Tirol	4-1	Grazer AK	Tivoli Stadion, Innsbruck
19:30	Pacult 22', 26' (pen.), 37'; Hörtnagl 68'		Hasenhüttl 76'	Attendance: 7,000; Referee: Udo Kratzer

12 May 1989 32	Austria Wien	1-1	Swarovski Tirol	Franz Horr Stadium, Vienna
19:30	Degeorgi 12'		Westerthaler 85'	Attendance: 4,000; Referee: Hubert Forstinger

26 May 1989 33	Swarovski Tirol	2-2	Admira Wacker	Tivoli Stadion, Innsbruck
19:30	Pacult 24' (pen.); Müller 57'		Rodax 33'; Dötzl 74'	Attendance: 11,000; Referee: Günther Lindner

2 June 1989 34	First Vienna	0-4	Swarovski Tirol	Hohe Warte Stadium, Vienna
19:00			Pacult 34', 82'; Marko 44'; Linzmaier 54'	Attendance: 2,300; Referee: Roman Steindl

7 June 1989 35	Wiener Sport-Club	0-3	Swarovski Tirol	Sportclub-Platz, Vienna
19:30			Hörtnagl 2'; Wazinger 42'; Pacult 66'	Attendance: 3,000; Referee: Dr. Gerhard Kapl

9 June 1989 36	Swarovski Tirol	1-3	Rapid Wien	Tivoli Stadion, Innsbruck
19:30	Pacult 83'		Blizenec 4'; Pfeifenberger 80'; Huyer 89'	Attendance: 17,200; Referee: Gerd Grabher

=== ÖFB-Cup ===
15 August 1988 Second round	Admira Dornbirn	0-11	Swarovski Tirol	Dornbirn
17:45			Westerthaler 6'; Müller 26'; Pacult 35', 43', 68', 74', 83', 85'; Peischl 39'; Pezzey 54'; Marko 59' (pen.)	Attendance: 2,500

26 October 1988 Third round	FC Puch	0-4	Swarovski Tirol	Sportplatz, Puch
13:30			Pucher 19' (o.g.); Westerthaler 31'; Pacult 58'; Peischl 65'	Attendance: 3,000; Referee: Gerhard Pum

4 April 1989 Fourth round	WSG Wattens	1-2 (a.e.t.)	Swarovski Tirol	Alpenstadion, Wattens
16:30	Praster 97'		Pacult 104'; Westerthaler 105'	Attendance: 2,500; Referee: Udo Kratzer

18 April 1989 Quarter-final	First Vienna	0-1	Swarovski Tirol	Hohe Warte Stadium, Vienna
19:00			Pacult 72'	Attendance: 4,500; Referee: Helmut Kohl

25 April 1989 Semi-final	Swarovski Tirol	3-1	Austria Salzburg	Tivoli Stadion, Innsbruck
19:30	Westerthaler 1', 78'; Kalinić 82'		Mocinic 38'	Attendance: 8,000; Referee: Dr. Gerhard Kapl

2 May 1989 Final	Admira Wacker	2-0	Swarovski Tirol	Bundesstadion, Maria Enzersdorf
19:30	Aigner 75'; Rodax 83'			Attendance: 8,000; Referee: Gerd Grabher

23 May 1989 Final	Swarovski Tirol	6-2	Admira Wacker	Tivoli Stadion, Innsbruck
19:30	Pacult 23' (pen.); Westerthaler 31', 37'; Hörtnagl 48'; Müller 63'; Peischl 75'		Rodax 13'; Gruber 84'	Attendance: 17,000; Referee: Helmut Kohl
