= 1987 Austrian Supercup =

- Event: 1987 Austrian Supercup
Rapid Wien	Swarovski Tirol
2	1
- Date: 18 July 1987
- Venue: Gerhard Hanappi Stadium, Vienna
- Referee: Gerd Adanitsch
- Attendance: 3,000

The 1987 Austrian Supercup was a football match that saw the 1986–87 Bundesliga and 1986–87 Austrian Cup champions Rapid Wien face off against 1986-87 Austrian Cup finalists Swarovski Tirol. The match was held on 18 July 1987 at the Gerhard Hanappi Stadium in Vienna with 3,000 attendants. Rapid Wien defended their title that they won in the 1986 Austrian Supercup.

== Match details ==
18 July 1987
19:30 CET

Rapid Wien	2–1	Swarovski Tirol
Hrstic 5'; Garger 84'	Report	Marko 8'

Gerhard Hanappi Stadium, Vienna
Attendance: 3,000
Referee: Gerd Adanitsch

Rapid Wien:
GK	1	(Austria) Michael Konsel	(substituted off) 46'
DF	3	(Austria) Kurt Garger
DF	6	(Austria) Reinhard Kienast	(substituted off) 46'
DF	4	(Austria) Robert Pecl
DF	5	(Austria) Heribert Weber
MF	7	(Austria) Andreas Heraf
MF	8	(Austria) Peter Hrstic
MF	10	(Austria) Gerald Willfurth
MF	14	(Austria) Rudolf Weinhofer	(substituted off) 46'
MF	15	(Austria) Karl Brauneder
FW	9	(Socialist Federal Republic of Yugoslavia) Zlatko Kranjčar
Substitutes:
GK	-	(Austria) Herbert Feurer	(substituted on) 46'
DF	-	(Austria) Leo Lainer	(substituted on) 46'
FW	11	(Socialist Federal Republic of Yugoslavia) Zoran Stojadinović	(substituted on) 46'
Manager:
(Socialist Federal Republic of Yugoslavia) Otto Barić

Austria Wien:
GK	-	(Socialist Federal Republic of Yugoslavia) Tomislav Ivković
DF	-	(Austria) Robert Auer
DF	-	(Austria) Thomas Lenninger
DF	-	(Austria) Rudolf Strobl
MF	-	(Austria) Arnold Koreimann	(substituted off) 46'
MF	-	(Austria) Christian Peintinger
MF	-	(Austria) Heinz Peischl
MF	-	(West Germany) Hansi Müller
MF	-	(Austria) Rudolf Steinbauer
FW	-	(Austria) Rupert Marko
FW	-	(Austria) Peter Pacult	(substituted off) 52'
Substitutes:
MF	-	(Austria) Harald Eder	(substituted on) 46'
MF	-	(Austria) Alfred Hörtnagl	(substituted on) 52'
Manager:
(Austria) Ernst Happel

== See also ==
- 1986–87 Austrian Football Bundesliga
- 1986–87 Austrian Cup
