= 1986–87 SK Rapid Wien season =

Rapid Wien
1986–87 season
- Coach: Otto Baric
- Stadium: Gerhard-Hanappi-Stadion, Vienna, Austria
- Bundesliga: Champions (28th title)
- Cup: Winner (13th title)
- Austrian Supercup: Winner (1st title)
- Cup Winners' Cup: Round of 16
- Top goalscorer: League: Zlatko Kranjcar (18); All: Zlatko Kranjcar (22)
- Average home league attendance: 6,000

The 1986–87 SK Rapid Wien season was the 89th season in club history.

== Squad ==
=== Squad statistics ===
No.	Nat.	Name	Age	League		Cup		Supercup		European Cup		Total		Discipline	
No.	Nat.	Name	Age	Apps	Goals	Apps	Goals	Apps	Goals	Apps	Goals	Apps	Goals	Booked	Sent off (straight red)
Goalkeepers
1	(Austria)	Herbert Feurer	32	14		3		1		3		21		1	
1	(Austria)	Michael Konsel	24	22+1		4+1				1		27+2			
Defenders
3	(Austria)	Kurt Garger	25	36		6		1		3		46		7	
5	(Austria)	Heribert Weber	31	29	5	7		1		4		41	5	7	1
15	(Austria)	Karl Brauneder	26	26	4	3+1	1	1		3	1	33+1	6	2	
17	(Austria)	Peter Schöttel	19	6+3		1						7+3			
19	(Austria)	Robert Pecl	20	13+1		4				1+1		18+2		3	
Midfielders
2	(Austria)	Leo Lainer	25	28+2	3	6	1			4		38+2	4	10	1
6	(Austria)	Reinhard Kienast	26	29+1	12	7		1		4	3	41+1	15	4	1
7	(Austria)	Andreas Herzog	17	2+2								2+2		1	
10	(Socialist Federal Republic of Yugoslavia)	Petar Brucic	33	31	1	6		1		3		41	1	4	
12	(Austria)	Franz Weber	21	11+9	2	1+1	1			1		13+10	3	4	
13	(Austria)	Peter Hristic	24	24+5	15	6+1	4	1		2		33+6	19	2	
14	(Austria)	Rudolf Weinhofer	24	20+7	5	2+4		1		3+1	1	26+12	6	11	
18	(Austria)	Gerald Willfurth	23	19+3	4	5+2		1		1	1	26+5	5		
	(Austria)	Michael Horak	20	1								1			
	(Austria)	Alexander Krautgartner	19	0+1								0+1			
Forwards
7	(Austria)	Richard Niederbacher	24	11+3	8	1				4		16+3	8		
8	(Socialist Federal Republic of Yugoslavia)	Sulejman Halilovic	30	33+1	12	6	5	1	2	4	1	44+1	20	5	
9	(Socialist Federal Republic of Yugoslavia)	Zlatko Kranjcar	29	26+2	18	7	1	1	1	3	2	37+2	22	5	
11	(Austria)	Hermann Stadler	25	2+9		0+3		0+1		0+1		2+14			
16	(Austria)	Andreas Heraf	18	13+6	4	2	2	0+1		0+3		15+10	6		

== Fixtures and results ==
Win Draw Loss

=== League ===
Rd	Date	Venue	Opponent	Res.	Att.	Goals and discipline
1	22.07.1986	H	Admira	4-4	3,500	Kranjcar 3' 30', Weber H. 13', Hristic 47' (pen.)
2	26.07.1986	A	Vienna	1-1	5,700	Kranjcar 20'
3	01.08.1986	A	Swarovski Tirol	1-3	16,300	Kranjcar 64'; Lainer (red card) 69'
4	05.08.1986	H	Austria Klagenfurt	8-1	3,000	Hristic 12' 67' 89', Weinhofer 44', Kranjcar 54' (pen.) 87', Kienast R. 60', Niederbacher 74'
5	08.08.1986	A	Sturm Graz	5-3	6,000	Hristic 2' 14' 74', Kranjcar 55' (pen.), Halilovic 77'
6	15.08.1986	H	VÖEST Linz	4-1	3,300	Lainer 23', Niederbacher 29', Brauneder 34', Kienast R. 87'
7	22.08.1986	A	Wiener SC	4-0	9,000	Hristic 24', Brucic 36', Kranjcar 38' (pen.), Halilovic 70'; Kienast R. (red card) 63'
8	30.08.1986	H	Austria Wien	2-2	15,500	Willfurth 17', Kranjcar 34' (pen.)
9	02.09.1986	A	Eisenstadt	0-0	10,000	
10	06.09.1986	H	GAK	2-0	2,500	Willfurth 7', Kranjcar 71' (pen.)
11	13.09.1986	A	LASK	1-1	9,000	Heraf 59'
12	20.09.1986	H	LASK	7-1	3,600	Niederbacher 25' 50' 60', Kienast R. 34' 65', Weinhofer 53', Halilovic 90'
13	26.09.1986	A	Admira	3-0	9,000	Weinhofer 16', Weber H. 30', Brauneder 82'
14	04.10.1986	H	Vienna	4-1	6,000	Halilovic 21' 40', Niederbacher 37', Kranjcar 65' (pen.)
15	10.10.1986	H	Swarovski Tirol	2-1	17,000	Kranjcar 45', Niederbacher 51'
16	18.10.1986	A	Austria Klagenfurt	0-1	1,500	
17	25.10.1986	H	Sturm Graz	3-1	5,000	Niederbacher 55', Weber H. 73', Weinhofer 79'
18	01.11.1986	A	VÖEST Linz	3-4	5,000	Heraf 43', Hristic 70' (pen.), Weinhofer 77'
19	08.11.1986	H	Wiener SC	2-3	3,300	Weber F. 59', Weber H. 63' (pen.)
20	15.11.1986	A	Austria Wien	1-1	17,500	Kienast R. 11'
21	22.11.1986	H	Eisenstadt	4-2	2,500	Kienast R. 55' 57', Halilovic 71', Hristic 87'
22	29.11.1986	A	GAK	4-0	2,000	Kienast R. 6' 90', Lainer 27', Heraf 89'
23	14.03.1987	A	Sturm Graz	3-1	6,500	Hristic 18', Heraf 82', Halilovic 88'
24	21.03.1987	H	VÖEST Linz	4-0	6,000	Hristic 12' 54', Halilovic 34', Brauneder 86'
25	04.04.1987	A	Swarovski Tirol	2-0	12,000	Kranjcar 69', Koreimann 87' (o.g.)
26	11.04.1987	H	Austria Wien	1-3	17,500	Kranjcar 80' (pen.)
27	24.04.1987	A	LASK	0-2	8,500	Weber H. (red card) 52'
28	02.05.1987	H	Admira	2-1	2,800	Brauneder 36', Weber F. 46'
29	08.05.1987	A	Wiener SC	1-1	3,000	Lainer 77'
30	15.05.1987	H	Sturm Graz	1-1	2,500	Kienast R. 23'
31	22.05.1987	A	VÖEST Linz	4-1	1,800	Willfurth 9', Hristic 24' (pen.), Kranjcar 60' 76'
32	29.05.1987	H	Swarovski Tirol	3-0	4,200	Halilovic 6' 64', Willfurth 21'
33	06.06.1987	A	Austria Wien	2-0	17,000	Kienast R. 30', Kranjcar 58'
34	12.06.1987	H	LASK	3-1	4,000	Weber H. 19', Halilovic 74' 78'
35	20.06.1987	A	Admira	1-0	15,000	Kranjcar 77'
36	26.06.1987	H	Wiener SC	2-1	6,500	Hristic 55' (pen.), Kienast R. 61'

=== Cup ===
Rd	Date	Venue	Opponent	Res.	Att.	Goals and discipline
R2	19.08.1986	A	Wiener Neustadt	2-0	2,500	Halilovic 10' 70'
R3	28.03.1987	A	VSE St. Pölten	1-0	3,100	Heraf 56'
R16	21.04.1987	H	Eisenstadt	4-0	1,700	Hristic 41', Heraf 48', Bronkhorst 55' (o.g.), Weber F. 66'
QF	05.05.1987	A	St. Veit	3-0	1,500	Hristic 47' 63' (pen.), Halilovic 71'
SF	19.05.1987	H	VÖEST Linz	2-0	2,000	Hristic 32', Halilovic 64'
F-L1	09.06.1987	H	Swarovski Tirol	2-0	9,500	Lainer 5', Halilovic 45'
F-L2	16.06.1987	A	Swarovski Tirol	2-2	8,000	Kranjcar 33', Brauneder 80'

=== Supercup ===
Rd	Date	Venue	Opponent	Res.	Att.	Goals and discipline
F	19.07.1986	H	Austria Wien	3-1	3,300	Kranjcar 40', Halilovic 43' 70'

=== Cup Winners' Cup ===
Rd	Date	Venue	Opponent	Res.	Att.	Goals and discipline
R1-L1	17.09.1986	H	Club Brugge (Belgium)	4-3	11,000	Kienast R. 44' 57', Brauneder 45', Willfurth 47'
R1-L2	01.10.1986	A	Club Brugge (Belgium)	3-3	32,000	Kranjcar 57', Weinhofer 59', Halilovic 84'
R2-L1	22.10.1986	H	Lok Leipzig (East Germany)	1-1	18,000	Kranjcar 60'
R2-L2	05.11.1986	A	Lok Leipzig (East Germany)	1-2 (a.e.t.)	19,300	Kienast R. 65'
