= Bruno Pezzey =

Austrian footballer

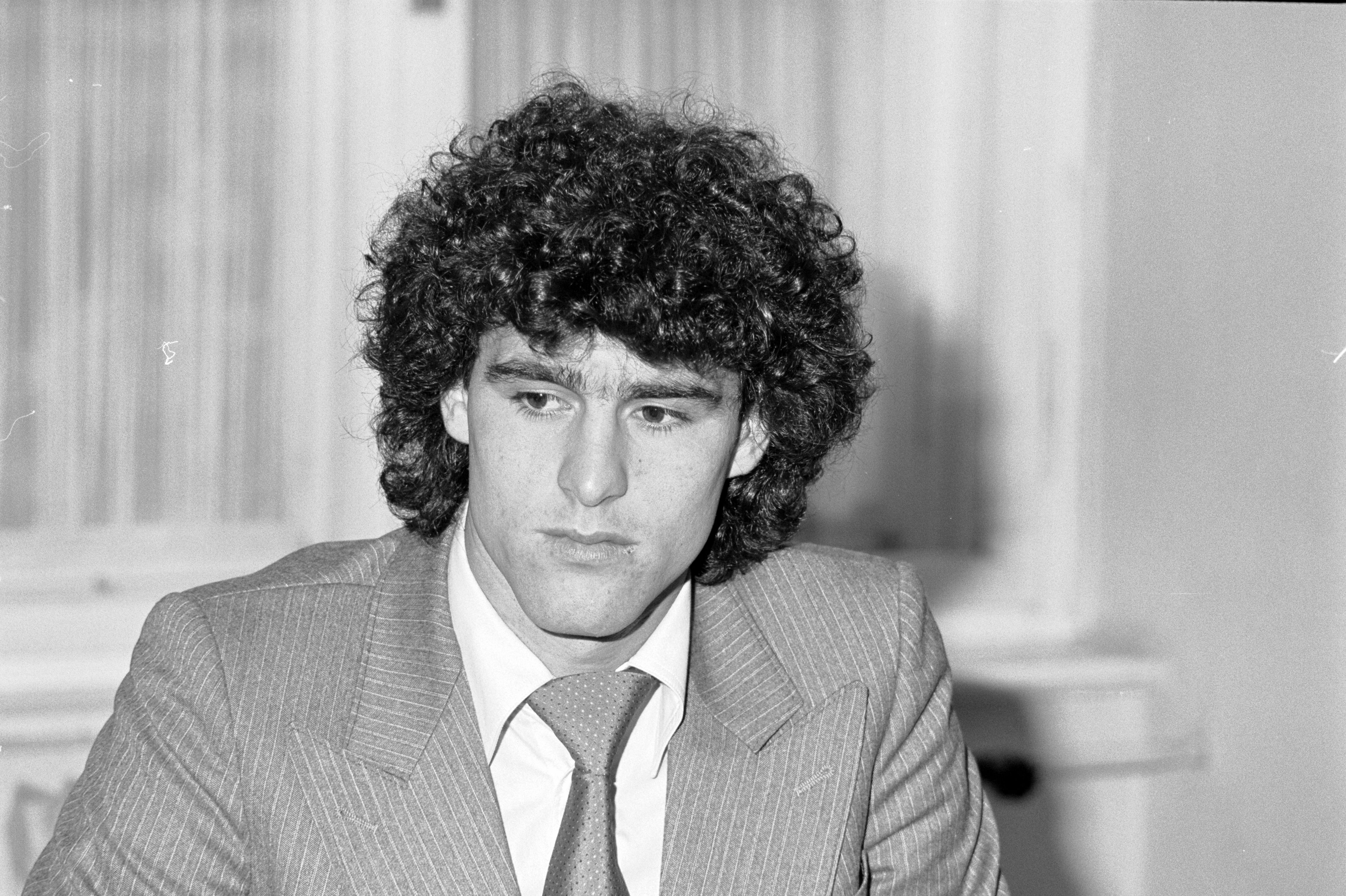
- Pezzey in 1978

Personal information
- Full name: Bruno Edmund Pezzey
- Date of birth: 3 February 1955
- Place of birth: Lauterach, Austria
- Date of death: 31 December 1994 (aged 39)
- Place of death: Innsbruck, Austria
- Height: 1.88 m (6 ft 2 in)
- Position: Defender

Youth career
- 1965–1973: FC Lauterach

Senior career*
Years	Team	Apps	(Gls)
1973–1974	FC Vorarlberg	28	(3)
1974–1978	Wacker Innsbruck	129	(19)
1978–1983	Eintracht Frankfurt	141	(27)
1983–1987	Werder Bremen	114	(18)
1987–1990	Swarovski Tirol	86	(6)
Total		498	(73)

International career
1975–1990	Austria	84	(9)

Managerial career
- 1991–1993: Austria U-21 (assistant)
- 1993–1994: Austria U-21
- * Club domestic league appearances and goals

Bruno Edmund Pezzey (3 February 1955 – 31 December 1994) was an Austrian professional footballer who played as a defender.

== Club career ==
Regarded as one of Austria's greatest defenders of all time, Pezzey started his professional career at local side FC Vorarlberg and moved to FC Wacker Innsbruck after only one season, winning two league titles and a domestic cup. The sweeper then joined Eintracht Frankfurt in 1978, winning the UEFA Cup and a DFB-Pokal. Four seasons with Werder Bremen did not bring him any silverware (but runner-up to the league title twice), and he returned to Innsbruck in 1987 to win two league titles and a domestic cup again.

== International career ==
Pezzey made his debut for Austria in June 1975 against Czechoslovakia and was a participant at the 1978 FIFA World Cup and 1982 FIFA World Cup. In the latter tournament, he scored Austria's first goal in the 2–2 draw with Northern Ireland in Madrid. He earned 84 caps, scoring nine goals, still in 2016 ranked fifth with Friedrich Koncilia in Austria's all-time appearances list. His final international appearance was an August 1990 friendly match against Switzerland.

== Death and legacy ==
Pezzey died of heart failure in an Innsbruck hospital on New Year's Eve in 1994 after participating in a game of ice hockey, just a few weeks short of his 40th birthday. He left behind his wife and two daughters. His youth club, FC Lauterach, named its sports complex in his honour.

== Honours ==
Wacker Innsbruck

- Austrian Bundesliga: 1974–75, 1976–77
- Austrian Cup: 1974–75

Eintracht Frankfurt

- UEFA Cup: 1979–80
- DFB-Pokal: 1980–81

Swarovski Tirol

- Austrian Bundesliga: 1988–89, 1989–90
- Austrian Cup: 1988–89

Individual

- Sport Ideal European XI: 1979
- Kicker Bundesliga Team of the Season: 1980-81, 1985-1986
- Guerin Sportivo All-Star Team: 1980, 1981
