= 1980–81 SK Rapid Wien season =

Rapid Wien
1980–81 season
- Coach: Walter Skocik
- Stadium: Gerhard-Hanappi-Stadion, Vienna, Austria
- Bundesliga: 3rd
- Cup: Quarter-finals
- Top goalscorer: League: Christian Keglevits; Hans Krankl (16 each); All: Christian Keglevits (18)
- Average home league attendance: 9,800

The 1980–81 SK Rapid Wien season was the 83rd season in club history.

== Squad ==
=== Squad statistics ===
| No. | Nat. | Name | Age | League | | Cup | | Total | | Discipline | |
| No. | Nat. | Name | Age | Apps | Goals | Apps | Goals | Apps | Goals | Booked | Sent off (straight red) |
Goalkeepers
| 1 | (Austria) | Karl Ehn | 26 | 3 | | | | 3 | | | |
| 1 | (Austria) | Herbert Feurer | 26 | 33 | | 3 | | 36 | | | |
Defenders
| 2 | (Austria) | Bernd Krauss | 23 | 34 | 3 | 3 | | 37 | 3 | 5 | |
| 3 | (Austria) | Peter Persidis | 33 | 18 | | 2 | | 20 | | 4 | |
| 4 | (Austria) | Martin Lefor | 20 | 6+5 | | 0+1 | | 6+6 | | | |
| 4 | (Austria) | Johann Pregesbauer | 22 | 35 | 4 | 3 | | 38 | 4 | 1 | |
| 5 | (Austria) | Heribert Weber | 25 | 30 | 5 | 3 | 2 | 33 | 7 | 2 | |
| 12 | (Austria) | Kurt Garger | 19 | 27+1 | 1 | 1 | | 28+1 | 1 | 4 | |
| 12 | (Austria) | Christian Janitsch | 20 | 1 | | | | 1 | | | |
| 17 | (West Germany) | Peter Salisch | 19 | 6+3 | | 0+1 | | 6+4 | | 1 | |
Midfielders
| 6 | (Austria) | Reinhard Kienast | 20 | 29 | 7 | 3 | | 32 | 7 | 2 | 1 |
| 8 | (Czechoslovakia) | Antonín Panenka | 29 | 18 | 4 | 1 | | 19 | 4 | 1 | |
| 10 | (Austria) | Josef Hickersberger | 32 | 25+2 | 1 | 3 | 1 | 28+2 | 2 | 5 | 1 |
| 14 | (Austria) | Rudolf Weinhofer | 18 | 8+9 | 1 | 0+1 | | 8+10 | 1 | | |
| 15 | (Austria) | Heinz Weiss | 20 | 5+7 | 1 | 2 | 1 | 7+7 | 2 | | |
| 16 | (Austria) | Peter Sallmayer | 19 | 23+1 | 2 | 2 | | 25+1 | 2 | 3 | |
Forwards
| 7 | (Czechoslovakia) | František Veselý | 36 | 9+11 | 1 | 1+1 | | 10+12 | 1 | | |
| 9 | (Austria) | Hans Krankl | 27 | 18 | 16 | 1 | | 19 | 16 | 1 | |
| 11 | (Austria) | Christian Keglevits | 19 | 35 | 16 | 3 | 2 | 38 | 18 | 2 | |
| 13 | (Austria) | Helmut Hofmann | 19 | 0+3 | | | | 0+3 | | | |
| 17 | (Soviet Union) | Anatoli Zinchenko | 30 | 0+2 | | | | 0+2 | | | |
| 18 | (Austria) | Johann Gröss | 20 | 28 | 5 | 2+1 | 3 | 30+1 | 8 | | |
| 19 | (Austria) | Rudolf Steinbauer | 20 | 5+13 | | | | 5+13 | | | |

== Fixtures and results ==
Win Draw Loss

=== League ===
| Rd | Date | Venue | Opponent | Res. | Att. | Goals and discipline |
|---|---|---|---|---|---|---|
| 1 | 14.08.1980 | H | Wiener SC | 0-1 | 9,000 | |
| 2 | 22.08.1980 | H | Eisenstadt | 4-0 | 11,000 | Keglevits 12' 48', Hickersberger 66', Pregesbauer 74' |
| 3 | 30.08.1980 | A | GAK | 1-3 | 8,000 | Gröss 28' |
| 4 | 05.09.1980 | H | VÖEST Linz | 4-2 | 7,500 | Keglevits 35', Kienast R. 39' 69', Weber H. 85' |
| 5 | 13.09.1980 | A | Admira | 2-0 | 7,000 | Weber H. 28', Keglevits 41' |
| 6 | 20.09.1980 | H | Austria Wien | 2-5 | 20,000 | Keglevits 1', Baumeister 68' (o.g.) |
| 7 | 27.09.1980 | A | Austria Salzburg | 4-1 | 5,000 | Kienast R. 4', Veselý 51', Sallmayer 53', Keglevits 83' |
| 8 | 04.10.1980 | H | Sturm Graz | 4-1 | 10,000 | Weinhofer 25', Pregesbauer 47' 85', Keglevits 90' |
| 9 | 11.10.1980 | A | LASK | 1-3 | 7,000 | Keglevits 69'; Kienast R. (red card) 82' |
| 10 | 14.10.1980 | H | LASK | 0-1 | 5,700 | |
| 11 | 18.10.1980 | A | Wiener SC | 0-1 | 6,000 | |
| 12 | 25.10.1980 | A | Eisenstadt | 2-0 | 6,500 | Krauss 21', Sallmayer 81' |
| 13 | 29.10.1980 | H | GAK | 0-2 | 6,500 | |
| 14 | 01.11.1980 | A | VÖEST Linz | 1-1 | 2,500 | Garger 70' |
| 15 | 08.11.1980 | H | Admira | 0-0 | 3,100 | |
| 16 | 19.11.1980 | A | Austria Wien | 1-3 | 8,800 | Kienast R. 65' |
| 17 | 22.11.1980 | H | Austria Salzburg | 2-1 | 3,000 | Kienast R. 45', Gröss 49' |
| 18 | 29.11.1980 | A | Sturm Graz | 1-3 | 15,000 | Weber H. 86' |
| 19 | 21.02.1981 | H | Wiener SC | 2-0 | 11,000 | Keglevits 12', Gröss 51' |
| 20 | 28.02.1981 | H | Eisenstadt | 3-1 | 9,000 | Krankl 54' 61' (pen.), Pregesbauer 74' |
| 21 | 07.03.1981 | A | GAK | 3-1 | 12,000 | Gröss 45', Krankl 46', Kienast R. 81' |
| 22 | 14.03.1981 | H | VÖEST Linz | 0-0 | 18,000 | |
| 23 | 21.03.1981 | A | Admira | 3-0 | 12,000 | Keglevits 25', Weber H. 72', Krankl 87' |
| 24 | 28.03.1981 | H | Austria Wien | 5-1 | 20,000 | Daxbacher 23' (o.g.), Panenka 34', Kienast R. 35', Krankl 65' 89' |
| 25 | 04.04.1981 | A | Austria Salzburg | 1-1 | 12,000 | Panenka 32' |
| 26 | 11.04.1981 | H | Sturm Graz | 3-1 | 12,000 | Keglevits 31', Weber H. 37', Krankl 39' (pen.) |
| 27 | 18.04.1981 | A | LASK | 1-1 | 9,000 | Panenka 34' |
| 28 | 21.04.1981 | H | LASK | 4-0 | 10,500 | Krankl 18' 56', Panenka 40', Keglevits 54' |
| 29 | 02.05.1981 | A | Wiener SC | 5-3 | 8,500 | Krankl 34' 40' 71' 88', Keglevits 61' |
| 30 | 09.05.1981 | A | Eisenstadt | 0-0 | 14,000 | |
| 31 | 15.05.1981 | H | GAK | 3-1 | 9,000 | Keglevits 14', Krankl 47' (pen.) 55' |
| 32 | 23.05.1981 | A | VÖEST Linz | 0-1 | 7,000 | |
| 33 | 31.05.1981 | H | Admira | 2-3 | 6,500 | Weiss H. 44', Krankl 84' (pen.) |
| 34 | 05.06.1981 | A | Austria Wien | 0-0 | 30,000 | |
| 35 | 13.06.1981 | H | Austria Salzburg | 1-0 | 4,500 | Gröss 53' |
| 36 | 20.06.1981 | A | Sturm Graz | 4-1 | 20,000 | Keglevits 38' 67', Krauss 48' 88' |

=== Cup ===
| Rd | Date | Venue | Opponent | Res. | Att. | Goals and discipline |
|---|---|---|---|---|---|---|
| R2 | 19.08.1980 | A | Wiener Neustadt | 8-1 | 5,000 | Fleck 25' (o.g.), Keglevits 50' 77', Gröss 55' 85', Hickersberger 60', Weiss H. 69', Weber H. 72' |
| R16 | 02.09.1980 | H | VÖEST Linz | 2-0 (a.e.t.) | 5,500 | Gröss 98', Weber H. 115' |
| QF | 07.04.1981 | A | GAK | 0-1 | 10,000 | Hickersberger (red card) 44' |
