= 1988–89 Austrian Cup =

Tournament details
- Country: Austria

Final positions
- Champions: Swarovski Tirol
- Runners-up: Admira/Wacker

The 1988–89 Austrian Cup (German: ÖFB-Cup) was the 55th season of Austria's nationwide football cup competition. The final was played over two legs, on 2 May 1989 at the Bundesstadion Südstadt, Maria Enzersdorf and on 23 May 1989 at the Tivoli, Innsbruck.

The competition was won by Swarovski Tirol after beating Admira/Wacker 6–4 on aggregate.

== Second round ==
Team 1	Score	Team 2
15 August 1988
1. SC Wiener Neustadt	2–6 (a.e.t.)	SV Stockerau
ASK Baumgarten	1–4	FK Austria Wien
Admira Dornbirn	0–11	FC Swarovski Tirol
FC Puch	1–0	Chemie Linz
SC Fürstenfeld	1–2	SK Sturm Graz
SVG Bleiburg	3–0	Wolfsberger AC
SK Zell am Ziller	0–4	FC Dornbirn
16 August 1988
ASKÖ Steyrermühl	1–4	Linzer ASK
Austria Tabak Linz	4–2	FC Salzburg
Badener AC	1–4	Kremser SC
FC Veitsch	0–9	Grazer AK
Favoritner AC	1–4	First Vienna FC
Friesacher AC	1–4	SC Pinkafeld
LUV Graz	2–4	Austria Klagenfurt
SAK Klagenfurt	0–2	Donawitzer SV Alpine
SC Tulln	3–2	Wiener Sport-Club
SK Bischofshofen	1–2	VOEST Linz
SK St. Magdalena	0–2	SV Austria Salzburg
SV Ilz	1–5	SV Flavia Solva
SV Oberwart	0–3	SK Rapid Wien
Salzburger AK 1914	0–1	SK Vorwärts Steyr
Schwarz-Weiß Bregenz	0–3	SV Spittal/Drau
Slovan/HAC	3–2	SC Gaswerk/Straßenbahn
TSV Hartberg	2–1	SV Feldkirchen
Union Esternberg	0–1	SV Ried
VfB Hohenems	1–0 (a.e.t.)	FC Kufstein
WSG Wattens	4–0	SV Axams
Wacker/Groß Viktoria	2–0	VfB Union Mödling
17 August 1988
SR Donaufeld	4–4 (a.e.t.) (2–3 p)	SV Güssing
30 August 1988
1. SV Wiener Neudorf	0–1	VSE St. Pölten
6 September 1988
ASV Vösendorf	0–2	Admira/Wacker

== Third round ==
Team 1	Score	Team 2
25 October 1988
Kremser SC	0–2	SV Stockerau
TSV Hartberg	2–1	Austria Klagenfurt
VOEST Linz	2–3	Linzer ASK
26 October 1988
Austria Tabak Linz	0–1	SV Spittal/Drau
Donawitzer SV Alpine	1–0 (a.e.t.)	SK Vorwärts Steyr
FC Puch	0–4	FC Swarovski Tirol
SC Pinkafeld	0–2	SV Flavia Solva
SC Tulln	0–4	SK Rapid Wien
SC Zwettl	0–3 (a.e.t.)	Admira/Wacker
SV Ried	1–3	SK Sturm Graz
SVG Bleiburg	1–2	Grazer AK
Slovan/HAC	3–3 (a.e.t.) (5–4 p)	VSE St. Pölten
VfB Hohenems	1–2	SV Austria Salzburg
WSG Wattens	3–1	FC Dornbirn
15 November 1988
SV Güssing	0–5	FK Austria Wien
11 December 1988
Wacker/Groß Viktoria	1–4	First Vienna FC

== Fourth round ==
Team 1	Score	Team 2
4 April 1989
Admira/Wacker	3–2 (a.e.t.)	SK Rapid Wien
FK Austria Wien	1–0	Linzer ASK
SV Austria Salzburg	2–0 (a.e.t.)	Donawitzer SV Alpine
SV Stockerau	3–1	Grazer AK
Slovan/HAC	1–2	First Vienna FC
SK Sturm Graz	1–0 (a.e.t.)	SV Flavia Solva
TSV Hartberg	2–2 (a.e.t.) (8–7 p)	SV Spittal/Drau
WSG Wattens	1–2 (a.e.t.)	FC Swarovski Tirol

== Quarter-finals ==
Team 1	Score	Team 2
18 April 1989
SV Stockerau	1–2 (a.e.t.)	FC Admira/Wacker
SK Sturm Graz	1–4	FK Austria Wien
TSV Hartberg	3–3 (a.e.t.) (4–5 p)	SV Austria Salzburg
First Vienna FC	0–1	FC Swarovski Tirol

== Semi-finals ==
Team 1	Score	Team 2
25 April 1989
FC Admira/Wacker	5–2 (a.e.t.)	FK Austria Wien
FC Swarovski Tirol	3–1	SV Austria Salzburg

== Final ==
=== First leg ===
2 May 1989
19:30

FC Admira/Wacker	2–0	FC Swarovski Tirol
Aigner 75'; Rodax 83'	Report

Bundesstadion Südstadt, Maria Enzersdorf
Attendance: 8,000
Referee: Gerd Grabher

=== Second leg ===
23 May 1989
19:30

FC Swarovski Tirol	6–2	FC Admira/Wacker
Pacult 23' (pen.); Westerthaler 31', 37'; Hörtnagl 48'; Müller 63'; Peischl 75'	Report	Rodax 13'; Gruber 84'

Tivoli, Innsbruck
Attendance: 17,000
Referee: Helmut Kohl

FC Swarovski Tirol won 6–4 on aggregate.
