= Aarhus Gymnastikforening in European football =

Denmark association football club

AGF in European football
- Club: AGF
- First entry: 1955–56 European Cup
- Latest entry: 2026–27 UEFA Conference League

AGF is an association football club from Aarhus, Denmark. The team has participated in six seasons of the UEFA Champions League/European Cup, seven seasons of the UEFA Cup/Europa League, five seasons of the UEFA Cup Winners' Cup, one season of the UEFA Europa Conference League and fifteen seasons of the Intertoto Cup/UEFA Intertoto Cup.

== Overall record ==
Accurate as of 28 August 2026

Competition	Played	Won	Drew	Lost	GF	GA	GD	Win%
European Cup / UEFA Champions League	22	8	4	10	29	35	−6	36.36
UEFA Cup / UEFA Europa League	22	5	5	12	24	39	−15	22.73
UEFA Cup Winners' Cup	18	7	5	6	28	23	+5	38.89
UEFA Europa Conference League	4	1	1	2	3	6	−3	25.00
Intertoto Cup/UEFA Intertoto Cup	82	32	18	32	128	128	+0	39.02
Total	141	52	32	57	203	213	−10	36.88

GF = Goals for; GA = Goals against; GD = Goal difference. Defunct competitions indicated in italics

=== Matches ===
Season	Competition	Round	Opponent	Home	Away	Aggregate
1955-56	European Cup	First round	(France) Stade de Reims	0–2	2–2	2–4
1956-57	European Cup	Preliminary round	(France) Nice	1–1	1–5	2–6
1957-58	European Cup	Preliminary round	(Northern Ireland) Glenavon	0–0	3–0	3–0
1957-58	European Cup	First round	(Spain) Sevilla	2–0	0–4	2–4
1960-61	European Cup	Preliminary round	(Poland) Legia Warsaw	3–0	0–1	3–1
1960-61	European Cup	First round	(Norway) Fredrikstad FK	3–0	1–0	4–0
1960-61	European Cup	Quarter-finals	(Portugal) Benfica	1–4	1–3	2–7
1961-62	UEFA Cup Winners' Cup	First round	(Germany) Werder Bremen	2–3	0–2	2–5
1965-66	UEFA Cup Winners' Cup	First round	(Portugal) Vitória de Setúbal	2–1	2–1	4–2
1965-66	UEFA Cup Winners' Cup	Second round	(Scotland) Celtic	0–1	0–2	0–3
1967	Intertoto Cup	Group B6	(Sweden) AIK	1–2	0–1	4th
1967	Intertoto Cup	Group B6	(Germany) Dynamo Dresden	1–2	1–2	4th
1967	Intertoto Cup	Group B6	(Slovakia) FC VSS Košice	1–1	1–3	4th
1979	Intertoto Cup	Group 7	(Bulgaria) Pirin Blagoevgrad	0–2	0–2	3rd
1979	Intertoto Cup	Group 7	Austria Salzburg	1–0	2–2	3rd
1979	Intertoto Cup	Group 7	(Poland) GKS Katowice	0–0	0–1	3rd
1979-80	UEFA Cup	First round	(Poland) Stal Mielec	1–1	1–0	2–1
1979-80	UEFA Cup	Second round	(Germany) Bayern Munich	1–2	1–3	2–5
1981	Intertoto Cup	Group 5	(Norway) IK Brage	2–1	1–0	1st
1981	Intertoto Cup	Group 5	(Austria) LASK	1–0	1–1	1st
1981	Intertoto Cup	Group 5	(Czechoslovakia) FC Zbrojovka Brno	4–2	0–3	1st
1982	Intertoto Cup	Group 3	(Czechoslovakia) TJ Plastika Nitra	1–0	4–3	1st
1982	Intertoto Cup	Group 3	(Austria) SK Sturm Graz	6–1	0–3	1st
1982	Intertoto Cup	Group 3	(Germany) Werder Bremen	2–1	1–4	1st
1983	Intertoto Cup	Group 4	(Switzerland) FC Luzern	8–3	0–1	2nd
1983	Intertoto Cup	Group 4	(Israel) Maccabi Netanya F.C.	1–2	1–3	2nd
1983	Intertoto Cup	Group 4	(Israel) Shimshon Tel Aviv F.C.	2–1	2–1	2nd
1983-84	UEFA Cup	First round	(Scotland) Celtic	1–4	0–1	1–5
1984	Intertoto Cup	Group 2	(Switzerland) FC Baník Ostrava	1–0	2–1	1st
1984	Intertoto Cup	Group 2	(Norway) Lillestrøm SK	2–2	2–2	1st
1984	Intertoto Cup	Group 2	(East Germany) FC Wismut Aue	2–1	2–1	1st
1984-85	UEFA Cup	First round	(Poland) Widzew Łódź	1–0	0–2	1–2
1985	Intertoto Cup	Group 7	(Switzerland) Young Boys	4–7	1–0	4th
1985	Intertoto Cup	Group 7	(Poland) Górnik Zabrze	2–3	1–2	4th
1985	Intertoto Cup	Group 7	(Hungary) Zalaegerszegi TE	4–4	0–1	4th
1985-86	UEFA Cup	First round	(Belgium) Waregem	0–1	2–5	2–6
1986	Intertoto Cup	Group 6	(Switzerland) Grasshoppers	2–1	1–4	2nd
1986	Intertoto Cup	Group 6	(Austria) Admira Wacker	1–0	2–0	2nd
1986	Intertoto Cup	Group 6	(Hungary) Újpesti Dózsa	2–3	0–1	2nd
1987	Intertoto Cup	Group 1	(Switzerland) Lausanne Sports	2–1	1–1	2nd
1987	Intertoto Cup	Group 1	(East Germany) FC Carl Zeiss Jena	1–1	2–2	2nd
1987	Intertoto Cup	Group 1	(Hungary) Vasas SC	1–0	1–2	2nd
1987-88	European Cup	First round	(Luxembourg) Jeunesse Esch	4–1	0–1	4–2
1987-88	European Cup	Second round	(Portugal) Benfica	0–0	0–1	0–1
1988	Intertoto Cup	Group 8	(Austria) FC Swarovski Tirol	0–1	3–3	3rd
1988	Intertoto Cup	Group 8	(Croatia) FK Rad Belgrade	3–0	0–3	3rd
1988	Intertoto Cup	Group 8	(East Germany) FC Carl Zeiss Jena	2–0	2–2	3rd
1988-89	UEFA Cup Winners' Cup	First round	(Northern Ireland) Glenavon F.C.	3–1	4–1	7–2
1988-89	UEFA Cup Winners' Cup	Second round	(Wales) Cardiff City	4–0	2–1	6–1
1988-89	UEFA Cup Winners' Cup	Quarter-finals	(Spain) Barcelona	0–1	0–0	0–1
1990	Intertoto Cup	Group 8	(Hungary) Vasas SC	2–0	2–0	2nd
1990	Intertoto Cup	Group 8	(Austria) First Vienna FC	1–2	1–1	2nd
1990	Intertoto Cup	Group 8	(Sweden) Gefle IF	0–0	0–0	2nd
1992	Intertoto Cup	Group 7	(Hungary) Váci Izzó MTE	0–1	0–2	3rd
1992	Intertoto Cup	Group 7	(Slovakia) ŠK Slovan Bratislava	2–0	2–2	3rd
1992	Intertoto Cup	Group 7	(Sweden) Kiruna FF	1–1	1–1	3rd
1992-93	UEFA Cup Winners' Cup	First round	(Sweden) AIK	1–1	3–3	4–4 (a)
1992-93	UEFA Cup Winners' Cup	Second round	(Romania) Steaua București	3–2	1–2	4–4 (a)
1993	Intertoto Cup	Group 7	(Czech Republic) SK Sigma Olomouc	—N/a	1–2	3rd
1993	Intertoto Cup	Group 7	(Romania) Oțelul Galați	4–0	—N/a	3rd
1993	Intertoto Cup	Group 7	Austria Salzburg	5–1	—N/a	3rd
1993	Intertoto Cup	Group 7	(Switzerland) Young Boys	—N/a	2–3	3rd
1995	UEFA Intertoto Cup	Group 1	(Poland) Górnik Zabrze	4–1	—N/a	4th
1995	UEFA Intertoto Cup	Group 1	(Germany) Karlsruher SC	—N/a	0–3	4th
1995	UEFA Intertoto Cup	Group 1	(Switzerland) FC Basel	2–1	—N/a	4th
1995	UEFA Intertoto Cup	Group 1	(England) Sheffield Wednesday	—N/a	1–3	4th
1996-97	UEFA Cup Winners' Cup	First round	(Slovenia) Olimpija Ljubljana	1–1	0–0	1–1 (a)
1997-98	UEFA Cup	Second qualifying round	(Hungary) Újpest FC	3–2	0–0	3–2
1997-98	UEFA Cup	First round	(France) Nantes Atlantique	2–2	1–0	3–2
1997-98	UEFA Cup	Second round	(Netherlands) FC Twente	1–1	0–0	1–1 (a)
2001	UEFA Intertoto Cup	First round	(Slovenia) Publikum Celje	1–0	1–7	2–7
2012–13	UEFA Europa League	Second qualifying round	(Georgia (country)) Dila Gori	1–2	1–3	2–5
2020–21	UEFA Europa League	First qualifying round	(Finland) Honka	5–2	—N/a	—N/a
2020–21	UEFA Europa League	Second qualifying round	(Slovenia) Mura	—N/a	0–3	—N/a
2021–22	UEFA Europa Conference League	Second qualifying round	(Northern Ireland) Larne	1–1	1–2	2–3
2023–24	UEFA Europa Conference League	Second qualifying round	(Belgium) Club Brugge	1–0	0–3	1–3
2026–27	UEFA Champions League	Second qualifying round	(Poland) Lech Poznań	1–4	4–1 (a.e.t.)	5–5 (4–3 p)
2026–27	UEFA Champions League	Third qualifying round	(Azerbaijan) Sabah	2–1	0–4	2–5
2026–27	UEFA Europa League	Play-off round	(Portugal) Benfica	1–3	1–3	2–6
