= Manfred Linzmaier =

Austrian footballer

Personal information
- Full name: Manfred Linzmaier
- Date of birth: 27 August 1962 (age 64)
- Place of birth: Kufstein, Austria
- Height: 1.83 m (6 ft 0 in)
- Position: Midfielder

Senior career*
Years	Team	Apps	(Gls)
1981–1986	FC Wacker Innsbruck	135	(14)
1986–1992	FC Swarovski Tirol	180	(25)
1992–1993	FC Wacker Innsbruck	16	(1)
1993–1995	LASK Linz	54	(9)
1995	Vorwärts Steyr	3	(0)
1996	FC Linz		
1996–1997	FC Kufstein		

International career
1985–1991	Austria	25	(2)

Managerial career
- 2001–2003: Hamburger SV (assistant)
- 2004–2005: 1. FC Kaiserslautern (assistant)
- 2005: Wüstenrot Sbg (interim)
- 2005–2006: Red Bull Salzburg (assistant)
- 2006–: Red Bull Salzburg (scout)
- 2015–: FC Ingolstadt (scout)
- * Club domestic league appearances and goals

Manfred Linzmaier (born 27 August 1962 in Kufstein) is a retired Austrian footballer. He is now a football manager.

== Club career ==
Nicknamed Tyroler Keegan, Linzmaier started his professional career at FC Wacker Innsbruck, later renamed FC Swarovski Tirol, and stayed for 12 years playing alongside German midfield maestro Hansi Müller. He moved to Second Division LASK Linz to clinch promotion to the Austrian Football Bundesliga. He then had a short spell at Vorwärts Steyr before winning the 2nd division title again with FC Linz. He finished his career at hometown club FC Kufstein.

After his playing career, he became assistant to head-coach Kurt Jara at FC Tirol, Hamburger SV and 1. FC Kaiserslautern.

== International career ==
He made his debut for Austria in 1985 and was a participant at the 1990 FIFA World Cup. He earned 25 caps, scoring 2 goals. His last international was a May 1991 friendly match against Sweden.

=== International goals ===
Scores and results list Austria's goal tally first.

#	Date	Venue	Opponent	Score	Result	Competition
1.	15 October 1986	Liebenau Stadium, Graz	Albania	3–0	3–0	Euro 1988 qualifier
2.	1 April 1987	Praterstadion, Vienna	Spain	1–1	2–3	Euro 1988 qualifier

== Honours ==
- Austrian Football Bundesliga (2):
  - 1989, 1990
- Austrian Cup (2):
  - 1989, 1993
