= 1986–87 Austrian Cup =

Tournament details
- Country: Austria

Final positions
- Champions: Rapid Wien
- Runners-up: Swarovski Tirol

The 1986–87 Austrian Cup (German: ÖFB-Cup) was the 53rd season of Austria's nationwide football cup competition. The final was played over two legs, on 9 June 1987 at the Gerhard Hanappi Stadium, Vienna and on 16 June 1987 at the Tivoli, Innsbruck.

The competition was won by Rapid Wien after beating Swarovski Tirol 4–2 on aggregate.

== Second round ==
Team 1	Score	Team 2
9 August 1986
SV Neuberg	4–0	Badener AC
19 August 1986
1. SC Wiener Neustadt	0–2	SK Rapid Wien
ASK Baumgarten	2–1	VfB Union Mödling
ASK Salzburg	1–2	Salzburger AK 1914
ASK Voitsberg	1–3	Linzer ASK
Amateure Steyr	1–3 (a.e.t.)	Donawitzer SV Alpine
FC Andorf	0–3	SK Sturm Graz
Eintracht Wels	1–3	SV St. Veit
FC Mölltal	2–2 (a.e.t.) (4–5 p)	Austria Klagenfurt
FC Waidhofen/Ybbs	0–9	FK Austria Wien
LSV Wien	1–1 (a.e.t.) (4–3 p)	SV Schwechat
Mautner Wien	1–3 (a.e.t.)	VSE St. Pölten
ASK Nettingsdorf	0–8	Grazer AK
SG Red Star/Auto	0–3	First Vienna FC
SAK Klagenfurt	2–0	Union Vöcklamarkt
SC Fürstenfeld	0–1 (a.e.t.)	Kapfenberger SV
SC Imst	2–4	SV Austria Salzburg
SC Untersiebenbrunn	2–7	SC Eisenstadt
SK Bischofshofen	0–3	SC Kufstein
SK St. Magdalena	1–0	SV Spittal/Drau
SV Feldkirchen	2–0	Kapfenberger SV Amateure
SV Gmunden	1–3 (a.e.t.)	SV Flavia Solva
SV Oberwart	1–2	Admira/Wacker
SV Rottenmann	0–1	VOEST Linz
SV Heid Stockerau	2–5	Kremser SC
TSV Hartberg	1–0	Wiener Sport-Club
VfB Hohenems	2–0	IG Bregenz/Dornbirn
Viktoria 62 Bregenz	0–6	FC Swarovski Tirol
20 August 1986
ASK Ybbs	1–0	SC Zwettl
SV Rum	0–1	SSV Neustift
USV Salzburg-Taxham	2–0	WSG Wattens
Union Matrei	2–1	SK Vorwärts Steyr

== Third round ==
Team 1	Score	Team 2
27 March 1987
USV Salzburg-Taxham	1–1 (a.e.t.) (4–3 p)	Grazer AK
28 March 1987
Eggenberger SK Graz	1–5	Admira/Wacker
ASK Ybbs	0–2	First Vienna FC
Donawitzer SV Alpine	0–2	SK Sturm Graz
LSV Wien	0–2	SC Eisenstadt
SSV Neustift	0–4	SV Austria Salzburg
SAK Klagenfurt	0–0 (a.e.t.) (3–2 p)	Linzer ASK
SK St. Magdalena	1–2	SV Flavia Solva
SV Neuberg	2–5	FK Austria Wien
Salzburger AK 1914	0–2	FC Swarovski Tirol
TSV Hartberg	2–4	Kremser SC
VSE St. Pölten	0–1	SK Rapid Wien
VfB Hohenems	0–3	SC Kufstein
29 March 1987
Kapfenberger SV	1–3	Austria Klagenfurt
7 April 1987
SV Feldkirchen	0–2	VOEST Linz
14 April 1987
Union Matrei	0–1	SV St. Veit

== Fourth round ==
Team 1	Score	Team 2
17 April 1987
SC Kufstein	0–1 (a.e.t.)	SV Austria Salzburg
First Vienna FC	2–0	Austria Klagenfurt
18 April 1987
Admira/Wacker	3–1	SK Sturm Graz
FK Austria Wien	3–0^{1}	Kremser SC
FC Swarovski Tirol	4–1	SV Flavia Solva
SV St. Veit	2–1 (a.e.t.)	SAK Klagenfurt
20 April 1987
USV Salzburg-Taxham	2–4	VOEST Linz
21 April 1987
SK Rapid Wien	4–0	SC Eisenstadt

Notes

- Note 1: The match was originally finished 2–0 for Krems, but was awarded to Austria Vienna after Krems used the player Milosavljevic (4 yellow cards) without authorization.

== Quarter-finals ==
Team 1	Score	Team 2
5 May 1987
FC Swarovski Tirol	3–1	FK Austria Wien
SV Austria Salzburg	1–3	VOEST Linz
SV St. Veit	0–3	SK Rapid Wien
First Vienna FC	1–0	Admira/Wacker

== Semi-finals ==
Team 1	Score	Team 2
19 May 1987
SK Rapid Wien	2–0	VOEST Linz
20 May 1987
First Vienna FC	0–3	FC Swarovski Tirol

== Final ==
=== First leg ===
9 June 1987
19:30

SK Rapid Wien	2–0	FC Swarovski Tirol
Lainer 5'; Halilović 45'	Report

Gerhard Hanappi Stadium, Vienna
Attendance: 9,500
Referee: Heinz Holzmann

=== Second leg ===
16 June 1987
19:30

FC Swarovski Tirol	2–2	SK Rapid Wien
Messlender 40'; Pacult 75'	Report	Kranjčar 33'; Brauneder 80'

Tivoli, Innsbruck
Attendance: 8,000
Referee: Horst Brummeier

SK Rapid Wien won 4–2 on aggregate.
