= 1991–92 Austrian Football Bundesliga =

74th season of top-tier football league in Austria

Austrian Bundesliga
- Season: 1991–92
- Champions: FK Austria Wien

Statistics of Austrian Football Bundesliga in the 1991–92 season.

== Overview ==
Fall season is performed in 12 teams, and higher eight teams go into Meister playoff. Lower four teams fought in Mittlere Playoff with higher four teams of Austrian Football First League.

FK Austria Wien won the championship. An additional place for UEFA Cup was added following the UN ban to Yugoslavia.

=== Teams and location ===
Location of teams in the 1991–92 Austrian Football Bundesliga

Teams of 1991–92 Austrian Football Bundesliga

- FC Admira/Wacker
- Austria Salzburg
- Austria Wien
- Donawitzer SV Alpine
- First Vienna
- Kremser SC
- Rapid Wien
- Sankt Pölten
- Stahl Linz
- Swarovski Tirol
- Sturm Graz
- Vorwärts Steyr

== Autumn season ==
=== Table ===
Pos	Team	Pld	W	D	L	GF	GA	GD	Pts
1	Austria Salzburg	22	16	2	4	43	18	+25	34
2	Austria Wien	22	14	5	3	51	21	+30	33
3	Swarovski Tirol	22	12	5	5	48	34	+14	29
4	Stahl Linz	22	11	6	5	36	24	+12	28
5	Rapid Wien	22	10	7	5	37	24	+13	27
6	Admira/Wacker	22	10	7	5	33	22	+11	27
7	VSE St. Pölten	22	6	6	10	25	34	−9	18
8	Vorwärts Steyr	22	7	3	12	28	29	−1	17
9	Sturm Graz	22	6	3	13	21	36	−15	15
10	Kremser SC	22	4	6	12	23	43	−20	14
11	First Vienna	22	4	6	12	20	43	−23	14
12	Donawitzer SV Alpine	22	1	6	15	11	48	−37	8

Source: rsssf.com

=== Results ===
Home \ Away	ADM	ASZ	AWI	DON	FIR	KRE	RWI	STA	STU	SWA	VOR	StP
Admira/Wacker		2–0	3–0	3–1	3–2	2–1	2–0	0–0	3–1	0–0	2–1	3–0
Austria Salzburg	1–0		1–0	1–0	5–0	5–2	3–2	2–1	1–0	2–1	2–0	3–0
Austria Wien	1–0	3–2		8–1	3–0	2–1	5–1	5–0	5–0	2–2	2–0	1–0
Donawitzer SV Alpine	1–2	0–4	0–2		0–0	2–2	2–5	1–1	1–0	0–0	1–2	0–2
First Vienna	0–0	1–3	1–2	0–0		2–1	0–4	0–0	1–1	1–2	1–0	3–2
Kremser SC	0–0	0–1	2–2	3–1	2–2		0–1	0–6	1–3	1–2	0–0	1–1
Rapid Wien	1–1	1–0	1–1	3–0	3–0	0–1		0–1	2–2	2–1	2–0	4–1
Stahl Linz	2–2	0–0	2–1	2–0	2–1	4–1	1–1		2–1	2–0	1–0	2–0
Sturm Graz	2–1	0–2	0–0	1–0	2–1	0–1	0–1	2–1		1–2	0–2	1–0
Swarovski Tirol	3–2	2–2	3–4	4–0	5–1	3–2	0–0	4–3	3–2		2–1	4–2
Vorwärts Steyr	4–1	2–1	1–2	3–0	1–2	0–1	1–1	1–3	3–1	2–4		4–0
VSE St. Pölten	1–1	1–2	0–0	0–0	2–1	4–0	2–2	2–0	3–1	2–1	0–0	

Legend: Blue = home team win; Yellow = draw; Red = away team win.

== Spring season ==
=== Championship playoff ===
==== Table ====
Pos	Team	Pld	W	D	L	GF	GA	GD	Pts
1	Austria Wien	36	21	7	8	73	36	+37	33
2	Austria Salzburg	36	23	4	9	62	37	+25	33
3	Swarovski Tirol	36	21	5	10	69	49	+20	33
4	Admira/Wacker	36	17	9	10	57	42	+15	30
5	Rapid Wien	36	16	9	11	58	40	+18	28
6	Stahl Linz	36	15	9	12	47	45	+2	25
7	Vorwärts Steyr	36	12	5	19	47	48	−1	21
8	VSE St. Pölten	36	9	9	18	38	59	−21	18

Source: rsssf.com

==== Results ====
Home \ Away	ADM	ASZ	AWI	RWI	STA	SWA	VOR	StP
Admira/Wacker		3–2	1–0	3–1	3–1	1–2	2–1	4–1
Austria Salzburg	2–0		1–1	0–2	3–1	0–2	2–0	1–0
Austria Wien	3–2	2–1		2–1	4–0	3–0	1–1	3–1
Rapid Wien	0–0	1–1	1–0		4–1	4–0	4–3	1–0
Stahl Linz	2–2	1–2	0–1	1–0		1–0	1–0	0–0
Swarovski Tirol	2–0	5–0	2–1	1–0	0–1		2–1	3–0
Vorwärts Steyr	1–2	0–2	3–1	1–0	1–0	2–0		1–1
VSE St. Pölten	2–1	1–2	1–0	3–2	1–1	1–2	1–4	

Legend: Blue = home team win; Yellow = draw; Red = away team win.

=== Promotion/relegation playoff ===
==== Table ====
Pos	Team	Pld	W	D	L	GF	GA	GD	Pts
1	Sturm Graz	14	4	9	1	18	11	+7	17
2	VfB Mödling (Note: Belongs to Austrian Football First League)	14	5	6	3	16	15	+1	16
3	Linzer ASK	14	5	5	4	19	17	+2	15
4	Wiener SC	14	5	4	5	23	18	+5	14
5	First Vienna	14	5	4	5	15	13	+2	14
6	Donawitzer SV Alpine	14	6	2	6	17	20	−3	14
7	Kremser SC	14	3	6	5	22	25	−3	12
8	Grazer AK	14	3	4	7	12	23	−11	10

Source: rsssf.com

==== Results ====
Home \ Away	DON	FIR	GAK	KRE	LIN	STU	MÖD	WIE
Donawitzer SV Alpine		3–2	1–0	2–2	2–1	0–2	1–2	2–0
First Vienna	0–1		2–0	2–1	0–0	2–1	0–0	0–0
Grazer AK	1–0	3–1		0–1	1–0	0–0	1–1	4–4
Kremser SC	2–2	1–5	5–0		3–4	1–1	2–2	2–1
Linzer ASK	1–0	2–0	2–1	0–0		3–3	3–2	0–1
Sturm Graz	2–0	0–0	0–0	3–1	1–1		1–1	2–0
VfB Mödling	4–1	1–0	1–0	0–0	2–1	0–0		0–1
Wiener SC	1–2	0–1	5–1	3–1	1–1	2–2	4–0	

Legend: Blue = home team win; Yellow = draw; Red = away team win.
