= 1990–91 Austrian Football Bundesliga =

73rd season of top-tier football league in Austria

Austrian Bundesliga
- Season: 1990–91
- Champions: FK Austria Wien

Statistics of Austrian Football Bundesliga in the 1990–91 season.

== Overview ==
Fall season is performed in 12 teams, and higher eight teams go into Meister playoff. Lower four teams fought in Mittlere Playoff with higher four teams of Austrian Football First League.

FK Austria Wien won the championship.

=== Teams and location ===
Location of teams in the 1990–91 Austrian Football Bundesliga

Teams of 1990–91 Austrian Football Bundesliga

- FC Admira/Wacker
- Austria Salzburg
- Austria Wien
- Donawitzer SV Alpine
- First Vienna
- Kremser SC
- Rapid Wien
- Sankt Pölten
- Swarovski Tirol
- Sturm Graz
- Vorwärts Steyr
- Wiener Sport-Club

== Autumn season ==
=== Table ===
Pos	Team	Pld	W	D	L	GF	GA	GD	Pts
1	Swarovski Tirol	22	13	6	3	49	18	+31	32
2	Austria Wien	22	12	6	4	48	21	+27	30
3	Rapid Wien	22	13	3	6	47	21	+26	29
4	Sturm Graz	22	11	5	6	42	25	+17	27
5	Austria Salzburg	22	12	2	8	38	28	+10	26
6	Vorwärts Steyr	22	8	6	8	32	33	−1	22
7	Donawitzer SV Alpine	22	6	9	7	25	33	−8	21
8	Admira/Wacker	22	6	7	9	17	29	−12	19
9	Wiener SC	22	7	3	12	25	42	−17	17
10	First Vienna	22	6	5	11	29	48	−19	17
11	Kremser SC	22	3	7	12	18	40	−22	13
12	VSE St. Pölten	22	3	5	14	18	50	−32	11

Source: rsssf.com

=== Results ===
Home \ Away	ADM	ASZ	AWI	DON	FIR	KRE	RWI	STU	SWA	VOR	StP	WIE
Admira/Wacker		1–2	0–3	1–1	1–0	2–0	0–2	1–0	0–2	0–3	2–1	1–0
Austria Salzburg	1–1		3–2	1–2	1–1	1–0	2–0	0–1	0–1	2–1	5–1	2–0
Austria Wien	5–0	1–0		0–0	1–0	6–0	0–3	0–0	1–1	4–1	3–0	4–2
Donawitzer SV Alpine	1–3	0–4	1–1		4–1	2–1	0–0	0–2	0–3	0–0	4–0	1–1
First Vienna	2–1	3–2	2–6	3–3		2–2	0–2	1–0	0–0	1–1	3–1	0–2
Kremser SC	0–0	0–1	2–2	1–1	1–2		0–3	2–1	3–2	1–1	2–0	0–1
Rapid Wien	2–0	2–4	2–0	0–2	3–1	4–1		3–1	1–2	2–0	1–1	5–0
Sturm Graz	1–1	4–0	1–0	6–1	4–1	0–0	1–1		2–1	3–4	3–0	3–0
Swarovski Tirol	0–0	3–0	1–2	3–0	4–1	4–0	3–2	4–1		2–2	5–0	2–0
Vorwärts Steyr	0–0	1–0	0–2	0–1	3–0	3–2	1–2	1–3	3–3		1–3	2–1
VSE St. Pölten	2–1	1–2	1–4	1–1	2–5	0–0	1–0	2–2	0–0	1–2		0–2
Wiener SC	1–1	2–5	1–1	1–0	2–0	2–0	1–7	2–3	0–3	0–2	2–0	

Legend: Blue = home team win; Yellow = draw; Red = away team win.

== Spring season ==
=== Championship playoff ===
==== Table ====
Pos	Team	Pld	W	D	L	GF	GA	GD	Pts
1	Austria Wien	36	22	7	7	72	33	+39	36
2	Swarovski Tirol	36	21	9	6	78	35	+43	35
3	Sturm Graz	36	18	9	9	60	37	+23	32
4	Rapid Wien	36	18	5	13	67	41	+26	27
5	Austria Salzburg	36	15	7	14	58	48	+10	24
6	Admira/Wacker	36	9	14	13	31	48	−17	23
7	Vorwärts Steyr	36	10	12	14	46	57	−11	21
8	Donawitzer SV Alpine	36	9	11	16	38	61	−23	19

Source: rsssf.com

==== Results ====
Home \ Away	ADM	ASZ	AWI	DON	RWI	STU	SWA	VOR
Admira/Wacker		1–1	2–2	2–0	2–2	1–0	1–3	0–0
Austria Salzburg	1–1		0–2	3–2	0–0	1–1	1–2	5–0
Austria Wien	4–0	1–0		0–1	2–1	2–0	3–1	1–0
Donawitzer SV Alpine	0–0	2–5	0–2		2–0	0–2	2–1	1–1
Rapid Wien	1–0	4–2	1–2	4–0		0–1	3–2	0–2
Sturm Graz	0–0	3–1	2–0	2–1	3–1		0–0	1–1
Swarovski Tirol	3–1	1–0	4–1	3–1	2–0	3–0		3–2
Vorwärts Steyr	2–3	0–0	0–2	3–1	0–3	1–3	1–1	

Legend: Blue = home team win; Yellow = draw; Red = away team win.

=== Promotion/relegation playoff ===
==== Table ====
Pos	Team	Pld	W	D	L	GF	GA	GD	Pts
1	VOEST Linz (Note: Belongs to Austrian Football First League)	14	7	6	1	24	12	+12	20
2	Kremser SC	14	7	5	2	23	12	+11	19
3	VSE St. Pölten	14	7	5	2	19	9	+10	19
4	First Vienna	14	6	4	4	22	18	+4	16
5	VfB Mödling	14	4	4	6	16	14	+2	12
6	Linzer ASK	14	4	3	7	18	32	−14	11
7	Stockerau	14	2	4	8	16	28	−12	8
8	Wiener SC	14	3	1	10	14	27	−13	7

Source: rsssf.com

==== Results ====
Home \ Away	FIR	KRE	LIN	STO	MÖD	VOE	StP	WIE
First Vienna		2–0	5–1	1–1	1–0	2–2	2–0	2–1
Kremser SC	2–0		3–1	3–1	0–0	0–0	2–0	4–0
Linzer ASK	1–1	2–2		0–2	2–1	0–3	0–2	2–1
Stockerau	1–3	1–2	4–4		1–0	2–2	0–2	0–2
VfB Mödling	0–0	0–1	4–1	4–1		1–1	1–1	1–0
VOEST Linz	4–1	3–2	1–2	1–0	2–1		1–1	2–0
VSE St. Pölten	3–1	0–0	3–0	0–0	3–1	0–0		1–0
Wiener SC	2–1	2–2	1–2	4–1	0–2	0–4	1–3	

Legend: Blue = home team win; Yellow = draw; Red = away team win.
