= Peter Pacult =

Austrian football manager

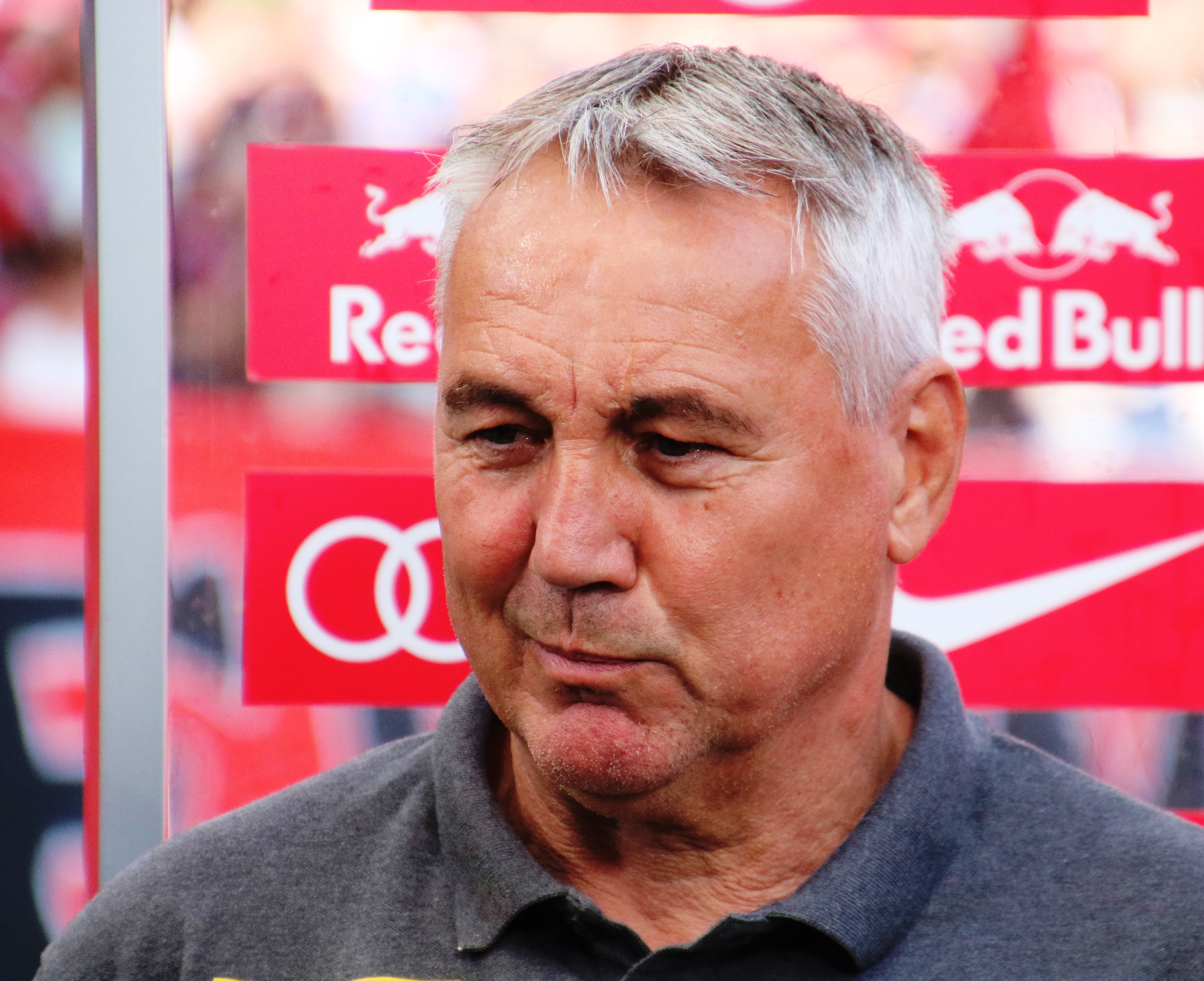
- Pacult in 2023

Personal information
- Date of birth: 28 October 1959 (age 67)
- Place of birth: Vienna, Austria
- Height: 1.82 m (6 ft 0 in)
- Position: Striker

Youth career
- 1977–1981: Floridsdorfer AC

Senior career*
Years	Team	Apps	(Gls)
1980–1984	Wiener SC	103	(47)
1984–1986	Rapid Wien	58	(26)
1986–1992	Swarovski Tirol	182	(105)
1992–1993	Stahl Linz	20	(5)
1993–1995	1860 Munich	53	(21)
1995–1996	Austria Wien	32	(2)
Total		448	(206)

International career
1982–1993	Austria	24	(1)

Managerial career
- 2001–2003: 1860 Munich
- 2004–2005: FC Kärnten
- 2005–2006: Dynamo Dresden
- 2006–2011: Rapid Wien
- 2011–2012: RB Leipzig
- 2012–2013: Dynamo Dresden
- 2015: Floridsdorfer AC
- 2015: Zavrč
- 2017: Cibalia
- 2017: Radnički Niš
- 2018: Kukësi
- 2019: OFK Titograd
- 2020–2025: Austria Klagenfurt
- 2025: Wolfsberger AC
- * Club domestic league appearances and goals

Peter Pacult (German: [ˈpeːtɐ patsʊlt], born 28 October 1959) is an Austrian professional football manager and former player. He last served as manager of Wolfsberger AC.

== Club career ==
A prolific striker, however not for the national team, Pacult started his career at Vienna side Floridsdorfer AC before turning professional with Wiener SC. He joined Austrian giants Rapid Wien four years later, losing the UEFA Cup Winners Cup Final in 1985 against Everton. He moved on to and won two league titles with FC Tirol Innsbruck, with whom he was the top goal scorer in the 1990–91 European Cup alongside Jean-Pierre Papin.

In 1993, he moved abroad to help TSV 1860 Munich win promotion to the Bundesliga. He finished his career at the other big Vienna club, Austria, in 1996.

== International career ==
He made his debut for Austria in October 1982 against Northern Ireland but was not considered for the 1990 FIFA World Cup. He earned 24 caps, scoring one goal. His last international was a November 1993 World Cup qualification match against Sweden.

=== International goal ===
Scores and results list Austria's goal tally first.

#	Date	Venue	Opponent	Score	Result	Competition
1.	20 September 1988	Letná Stadium, Prague	Czechoslovakia	1–2	2–4	Friendly

== Coaching career ==
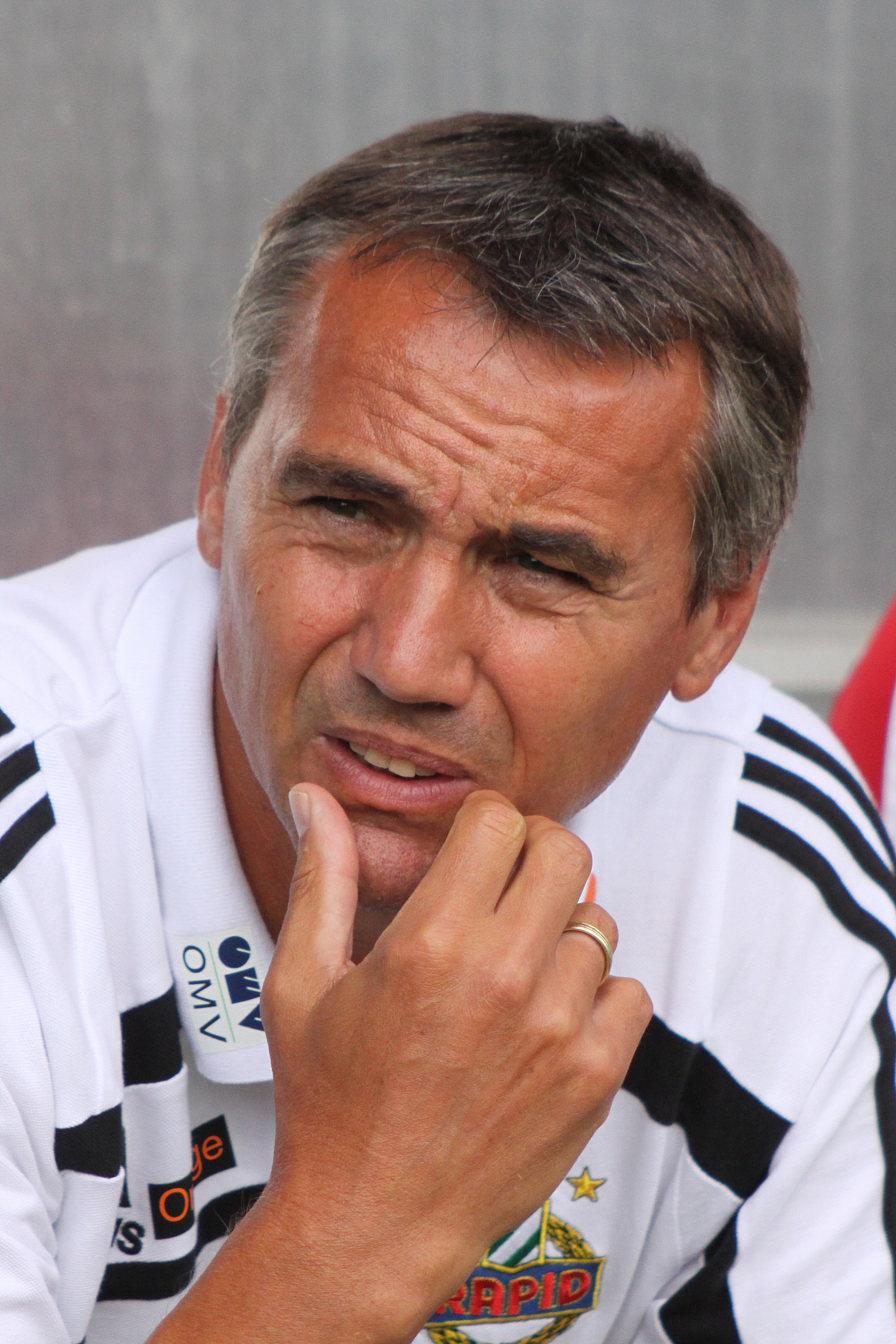
Pacult with Rapid Wien in 2009

Pacult was head coach of 1860 Munich II from April 2001 to June 2001, 1860 Munich from October 2001 to March 2003, FC Kärnten from January 2004 to June 2005, Dynamo Dresden from December 2005 to September 2006, Rapid Wien from September 2006 to April 2011, and RB Leipzig from July 2011 to July 2012. Pacult returned to Dynamo Dresden between December 2012 and August 2013. Both supporters and the club's board was dissatisfied with his performance during the last match; frustrated with recent results. He was hired to coach FAC Team für Wien on 22 April 2015.

In June 2017, he became the coach of Serbian SuperLiga side Radnički Niš. In March 2019, he became the coach of Montenegrin First League side OFK Titograd.

In December 2020, Pacult was appointed head coach of Austria Klagenfurt. Under his leadership, the club achieved its first-ever promotion to the top division, despite finishing third in the 2020–21 Austrian Second League. Since the top two clubs were ineligible for promotion, Klagenfurt advanced and secured their spot with a 5–0 aggregate victory over SKN St. Pölten in the play-off. However, by the end of the 2024–25 season, with the team struggling against relegation, he was dismissed from his position.

== Coaching record ==
As of 9 December 2023

Team	From	To	Record								
Team	From	To	G	W	D	L	GF	GA	GD	Win %	Ref.
1860 Munich II	1 April 2001	30 June 2001	9	2	3	4	12	16	−4	22.22	
1860 Munich	21 October 2001	12 March 2003	55	24	11	20	98	94	+4	43.64	
FC Kärnten	2 January 2004	30 June 2005	57	25	15	17	107	70	+37	43.86	
Dynamo Dresden	28 December 2005	4 September 2006	24	12	5	7	31	21	+10	50.00	
Rapid Wien	4 September 2006	11 April 2011	206	106	49	51	410	248	+162	51.46	
RB Leipzig	1 July 2011	3 July 2012	36	23	7	6	74	33	+41	63.89	
Dynamo Dresden	18 December 2012	18 August 2013	21	7	5	9	21	29	−8	33.33	
Floridsdorfer AC	22 April 2015	23 September 2015	19	3	2	14	16	33	−17	15.79	
Zavrč	6 October 2015	23 October 2015	1	0	0	1	1	2	−1	0.00	
Cibalia	7 January 2017	23 March 2017	5	0	1	4	2	8	−6	0.00	
Radnički Niš	1 July 2017	4 September 2017	7	4	2	1	10	8	+2	57.14	
Kukësi	3 January 2018	13 July 2018	25	12	9	4	38	24	+14	48.00	
OFK Titograd	8 March 2019	5 June 2019	14	6	4	4	25	19	+6	42.86	
Austria Klagenfurt	31 December 2020	27 April 2025	110	47	26	37	188	171	+17	42.73	
Wolfsberger AC	13 October 2025	12 November 2025	5	2	1	2	8	7	+1	40.00	
Total			594	273	140	181	1,041	783	+258	45.96	—

== Honours ==
=== Club ===
Rapid Wien

- Austrian Cup: 1984–85

Swarovski Tirol

- Austrian Bundesliga: 1988–89, 1989–90
- Austrian Cup: 1988–89

=== Individual ===
- Austrian Bundesliga Top Scorer: 1988–89 (26 goals)
- European Cup top scorer: 1990–91

=== Manager ===
Rapid Wien

- Austrian Bundesliga: 2007–08
