= Robert Wazinger =

Austrian footballer

Personal information
- Date of birth: August 23, 1966 (age 60)
- Height: 1.76 m (5 ft 9 in)
- Position: Defender

Senior career*
Years	Team	Apps	(Gls)
?–2000	FC Tirol Innsbruck		
2000–2001	WSG Wattens		
2001–2005	FC Wacker Innsbruck		
2005–2006	WSG Wattens		
2006	Svg Reichenau		

International career
1992-1993	Austria	5	(0)
- * Club domestic league appearances and goals

Robert Wazinger (born August 23, 1966) is a retired Austrian football player who played for the Austria national football team.

== Career ==
Wazinger made 381 Austrian Football Bundesliga appearances during his playing career, winning the league five times and the Austrian Cup twice. After he retired from playing, Wazinger became at assistant coach at WSG Wattens.
