= Hansi Müller =

German footballer

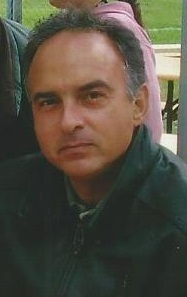

Personal information
- Full name: Hans Peter Müller
- Date of birth: 27 July 1957 (age 69)
- Place of birth: Stuttgart, West Germany
- Height: 1.80 m (5 ft 11 in)
- Position: Midfielder

Youth career
- SV Rot

Senior career*
| Years | Team | Apps | (Gls) |
| 1975–1982 | VfB Stuttgart | 186 | (65) |
| 1982–1984 | Inter Milan | 48 | (9) |
| 1984–1985 | Como | 17 | (1) |
| 1985–1990 | Swarovski Tirol | 123 | (35) |
| Total | | 374 | (110) |

International career
| 1976–1978 | West Germany Amateur | 7 | (3) |
| 1977–1978 | West Germany B | 5 | (0) |
| 1978–1983 | West Germany | 42 | (5) |
Medal record
Representing West Germany
UEFA European Championship
| Winner | 1980 Italy |
- * Club domestic league appearances and goals

Hans Peter "Hansi" Müller (born 27 July 1957) is a German former footballer who played as a midfielder.

== Personal life ==
Both his parents were of Danube Swabian descent (German: Donauschwaben) that were displaced from Yugoslavia after World War II. His father was born in Bačka Palanka and his mother in Inđija, both towns part of the province Vojvodina in Serbia.

== Club career ==
Müller began his career playing for his hometown side VfB Stuttgart. After the 1982 FIFA World Cup, he moved to Italy to play for Inter Milan for two seasons, and subsequently also spent a season with Como.

In 1985, he moved to Austria to play with FC Swarovski Tirol, where he ended his playing career in 1990.

== International career ==
Müller made his international debut in 1978. While at Stuttgart, Müller took part in UEFA Euro 1980 with West Germany, aged 22, after a brief taste of action at the 1978 FIFA World Cup, where he started all four games. The tournament would prove to be Müller's international peak as they emerged victorious. He had a disappointing 1982 World Cup, and despite playing in the Italian league, he made his 42nd and last appearance for West Germany the following year. In total he scored five international goals.

== After retirement ==
Müller was an official ambassador for the city of Stuttgart for the 2006 FIFA World Cup and Innsbruck at UEFA Euro 2008.

== Style of play ==
Müller was an elegant midfield playmaker, who usually played in the middle of the pitch. He was known for his clever passing and excellent left foot, as well as his charismatic presence and leadership on the field.

== Honours ==
Swarovski Tirol

- Austrian Football Bundesliga: 1988–89, 1989–90
- Austrian Cup: 1987–88

West Germany

- UEFA European Championship: 1980
- FIFA World Cup runner-up: 1982

Individual

- kicker Bundesliga Team of the Season: 1979–80, 1980–81
- UEFA European Championship Team of the Tournament: 1980
- Bravo Award: 1980
- Onze Mondial: 1981
