= Thomas Eder =

Austrian footballer

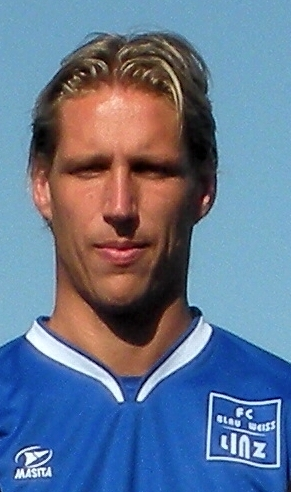

Personal information
- Full name: Thomas Günther Eder
- Date of birth: 25 December 1980 (age 45)
- Height: 1.85 m (6 ft 1 in)
- Position: Midfielder

Youth career
- Salzburger AK 1914
- SV Austria Salzburg

Senior career*
Years	Team	Apps	(Gls)
2001–2005	SV Austria Salzburg	62	(8)
2006–2007	SV Ried	38	(2)
2007	FC Wacker Innsbruck	18	(2)
2007–	SV Grödig	24	(0)

International career
2003–2006	Austria	2	(0)
- * Club domestic league appearances and goals

Thomas Günther Eder (born 25 December 1980) is an Austrian football player currently playing for SV Grödig.

== National team statistics ==
Austria national team
Year	Apps	Goals
2003	1	0
2004	0	0
2005	0	0
2006	1	0
Total	2	0
