= Rupert Marko =

Austrian footballer and manager

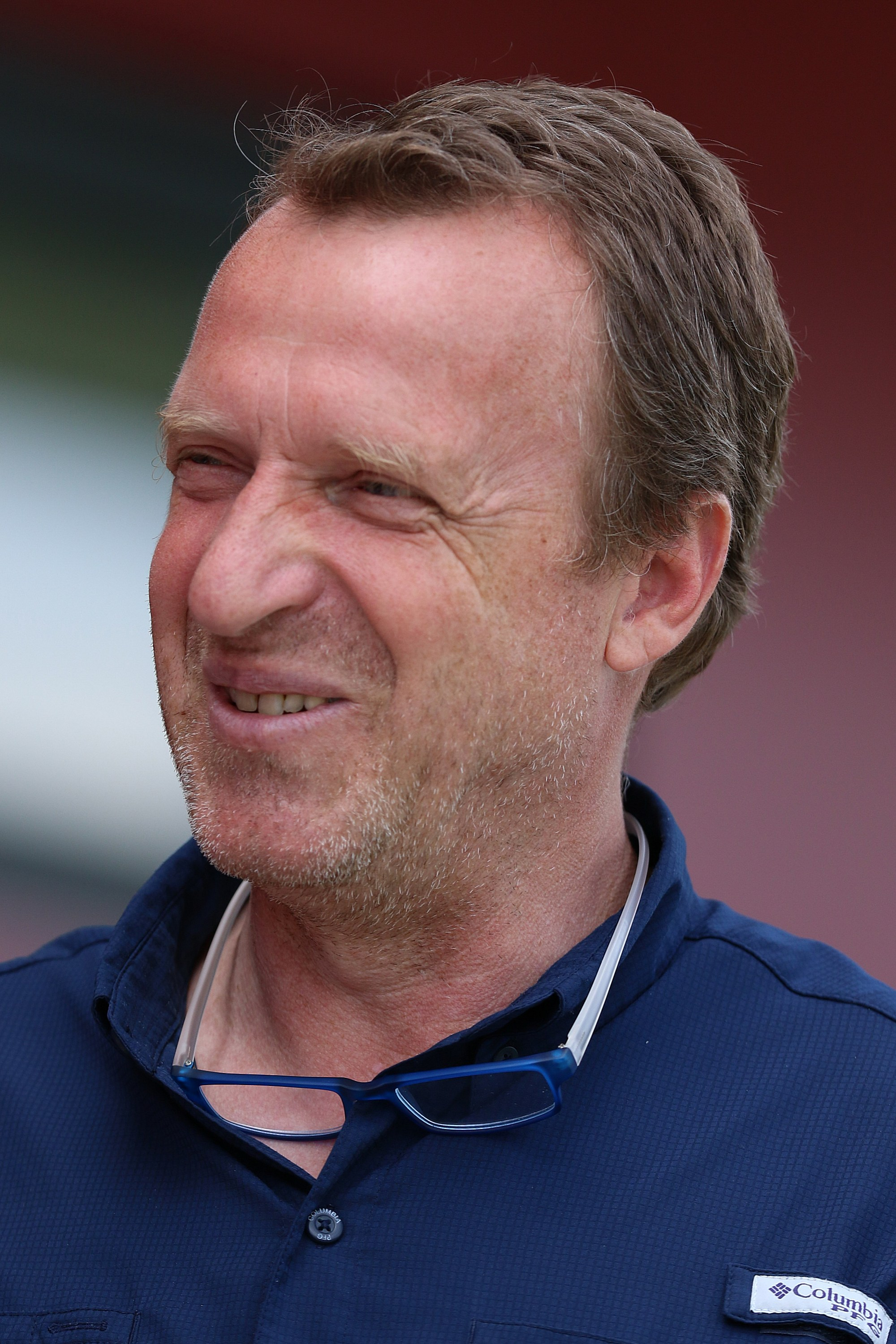

Personal information
- Date of birth: 24 November 1963 (age 62)
- Place of birth: Wagna, Austria
- Height: 1.77 m (5 ft 9 1/2 in)
- Position: Striker

Team information
- Current team: Austria U19 (manager)

Youth career
- SK Sturm Graz

Senior career*
Years	Team	Apps	(Gls)
1981–1987	SK Sturm Graz	101	(25)
1987–1989	Swarovski Tirol	47	(8)
1989–1990	SV Austria Salzburg	22	(12)
1990	Swarovski Tirol	1	(0)
1990–1991	→ FK Austria Wien (loan)	6	(1)
1991–1992	Swarovski Tirol		
1992	SK Sturm Graz	15	(1)
1993–1994	FC Gossau	26	(2)
1994–1996	SV Leibnitz Flavia Solva		

International career
	Austria	3	(3)

Managerial career
- 1996–2001: SK Sturm Graz (assistant)
- 2003–2005: ASK Kottingbrunn
- 2005–2010: SV Horn
- * Club domestic league appearances and goals

Rupert Marko (born 24 November 1963) is a retired Austrian football player and a coach currently managing the Austria U19 team.
