= Rudolf Steinbauer =

Austrian footballer

Personal information
- Date of birth: 9 September 1959 (age 67)
- Height: 1.80 m (5 ft 11 in)
- Position: Midfielder

Team information
- Current team: ASV Statzendorf (manager)

Senior career*
| Years | Team | Apps | (Gls) |
| ?–1980 | Grazer AK | | |
| 1980–1982 | SK Rapid Wien | | |
| 1982–1986 | Grazer AK | | |
| 1986–1988 | FC Swarovski Tirol | | |
| 1988–1994 | SKN St. Pölten | | |
| 1994–1996 | Grazer AK | | |

International career
| | Austria | 3 | (0) |

Managerial career
- ?–present: ASV Statzendorf
- * Club domestic league appearances and goals

Rudolf Steinbauer (born 9 September 1959) is a retired Austria international footballer and a football manager currently managing TSU Hafnerbach.
