= Peter Hrstic =

Austrian footballer (born 1961)

Personal information
- Date of birth: September 24, 1961 (age 65)
- Position: Midfielder

Youth career
- SK Austria Klagenfurt

Senior career*
Years	Team	Apps	(Gls)
1981–1984	SK Austria Klagenfurt	65	(30)
1985–1988	SK Rapid Wien	84	(27)
1988–1989	FC Swarovski Tirol		
1989–1993	Austria Salzburg		

International career
1985–1987	Austria	3	(1)
- * Club domestic league appearances and goals

Peter Hrstic (born September 24, 1961) is a retired Austria international footballer.

== Honours ==
- Austrian Football Bundesliga winner: 1987, 1988, 1989.
- Austrian Cup winner: 1985, 1987.
- UEFA Cup Winners' Cup finalist: 1985.
