= 1988 Intertoto Cup =

Tournament details
- Teams: 44

Tournament statistics
- Goals scored: 404

In the 1988 Intertoto Cup no knock-out rounds were contested, and therefore no winner was declared.

== Group stage ==
The teams were divided into eleven groups of four teams each.

=== Group 1 ===
Pos	Team	Pld	W	D	L	GF	GA	GD	Pts
1	(Sweden) Malmö	6	4	1	1	11	4	+7	9
2	(East Germany) Karl-Marx-Stadt	6	4	0	2	8	7	+1	8
3	(West Germany) Hannover 96	6	2	0	4	10	9	+1	4
4	(Netherlands) FC Den Haag	6	1	1	4	7	16	−9	3

=== Group 2 ===
Pos	Team	Pld	W	D	L	GF	GA	GD	Pts	GÖT	SIG	SLS	AAR
1	(Sweden) IFK Göteborg	6	3	2	1	10	7	+3	8	—	0–0	2–1	1–2
2	(Czechoslovakia) Sigma Olomouc	6	3	1	2	10	10	0	7	3–4	—	2–1	1–0
3	(Bulgaria) Slavia Sofia	6	2	1	3	8	9	−1	5	0–2	3–1	—	2–1
4	(Switzerland) FC Aarau	6	1	2	3	7	9	−2	4	1–1	2–3	1–1	—

Source: Pawel Mogielnicki's Page
Rules for classification: 1) Points; 2) Goal difference; 3) Goals scored; 4) Head-to-head points; 5) Away goals scored; 6) Draw.

=== Group 3 ===
Pos	Team	Pld	W	D	L	GF	GA	GD	Pts
1	(Czechoslovakia) Banik Ostrava	6	4	0	2	12	11	+1	8
2	(Sweden) Örgryte	6	2	3	1	13	9	+4	7
3	(Denmark) Brøndby	6	2	2	2	10	10	0	6
4	(East Germany) Chemie Halle	6	1	1	4	5	10	−5	3

=== Group 4 ===
Pos	Team	Pld	W	D	L	GF	GA	GD	Pts
1	Austria Wien	6	3	1	2	11	14	−3	7
2	(Czechoslovakia) RH Cheb	6	2	2	2	11	7	+4	6
3	(Denmark) Vejle	6	1	4	1	6	6	0	6
4	(Hungary) Tatabánya	6	1	3	2	7	8	−1	5

=== Group 5 ===
Pos	Team	Pld	W	D	L	GF	GA	GD	Pts	YBB	DAC	NOR	SZO
1	(Switzerland) Young Boys	6	4	0	2	16	9	+7	8	—	5–1	3–2	4–0
2	(Czechoslovakia) DAC Dunajská Streda	6	3	1	2	12	8	+4	7	3–1	—	5–1	3–0
3	(Sweden) IFK Norrköping	6	2	1	3	8	13	−5	5	0–2	1–0	—	2–2
4	(Hungary) Szombathelyi Haladás	6	1	2	3	6	12	−6	4	3–1	0–0	1–2	—

Source: Pawel Mogielnicki's Page
Rules for classification: 1) Points; 2) Goal difference; 3) Goals scored; 4) Head-to-head points; 5) Away goals scored; 6) Draw.

=== Group 6 ===
Pos	Team	Pld	W	D	L	GF	GA	GD	Pts	KAI	AWW	LUZ	ŁKS
1	(West Germany) 1. FC Kaiserslautern	6	4	1	1	15	8	+7	9	—	1–0	4–2	4–1
2	(Austria) Admira Wacker Wien	6	2	3	1	12	7	+5	7	1–1	—	2–0	2–2
3	(Switzerland) FC Luzern	6	3	1	2	11	10	+1	7	2–1	1–1	—	3–1
4	(Poland) ŁKS Łódź	6	0	1	5	9	22	−13	1	2–4	2–6	1–3	—

Source: Pawel Mogielnicki's Page
Rules for classification: 1) Points; 2) Goal difference; 3) Goals scored; 4) Head-to-head points; 5) Away goals scored; 6) Draw.

=== Group 7 ===
Pos	Team	Pld	W	D	L	GF	GA	GD	Pts
1	(Denmark) Ikast FS	6	5	1	0	20	2	+18	11
2	(Austria) Sturm Graz	6	2	3	1	13	10	+3	7
3	(Israel) Beitar Jerusalem	6	1	2	3	8	16	−8	4
4	(Israel) Shimshon Tel-Aviv	6	0	2	4	3	16	−13	2

=== Group 8 ===
Pos	Team	Pld	W	D	L	GF	GA	GD	Pts
1	(East Germany) Carl Zeiss Jena	6	3	1	2	8	11	−3	7
2	(Socialist Federal Republic of Yugoslavia) Rad	6	3	0	3	11	7	+4	6
3	(Denmark) AGF	6	2	2	2	10	9	+1	6
4	(Austria) FC Swarovski Tirol	6	2	1	3	10	12	−2	5

=== Group 9 ===
Pos	Team	Pld	W	D	L	GF	GA	GD	Pts	GCZ	PÉC	PSZ	ÖST
1	(Switzerland) Grasshopper Club	6	4	2	0	8	2	+6	10	—	1–0	1–0	1–1
2	(Hungary) Pécsi Munkás Sport Club	6	2	1	3	6	6	0	5	0–1	—	3–1	2–0
3	(Poland) Pogoń Szczecin	6	1	3	2	3	4	−1	5	0–0	0–0	—	2–0
4	(Sweden) Östers IF	6	1	2	3	5	10	−5	4	1–4	3–1	0–0	—

Source: Pawel Mogielnicki's Page
Rules for classification: 1) Points; 2) Goal difference; 3) Goals scored; 4) Head-to-head points; 5) Away goals scored; 6) Draw.

=== Group 10 ===
Pos	Team	Pld	W	D	L	GF	GA	GD	Pts
1	(West Germany) Karlsruher SC	6	3	1	2	13	7	+6	7
2	(Socialist Federal Republic of Yugoslavia) Vojvodina	6	3	1	2	11	7	+4	7
3	(Hungary) MTK Budapest	6	2	2	2	5	9	−4	6
4	(Austria) GAK	6	1	2	3	5	11	−6	4

=== Group 11 ===
Pos	Team	Pld	W	D	L	GF	GA	GD	Pts
1	(West Germany) Bayer Uerdingen	6	5	1	0	11	4	+7	11
2	(Denmark) OB Odense	6	3	1	2	16	10	+6	7
3	(East Germany) FC Magdeburg	6	2	0	4	9	15	−6	4
4	(Netherlands) AZ	6	1	0	5	10	17	−7	2

== See also ==
- 1988–89 European Cup
- 1988–89 European Cup Winners' Cup
- 1988–89 UEFA Cup
