= Christoph Westerthaler =

Austrian footballer and coach (1965–2018)

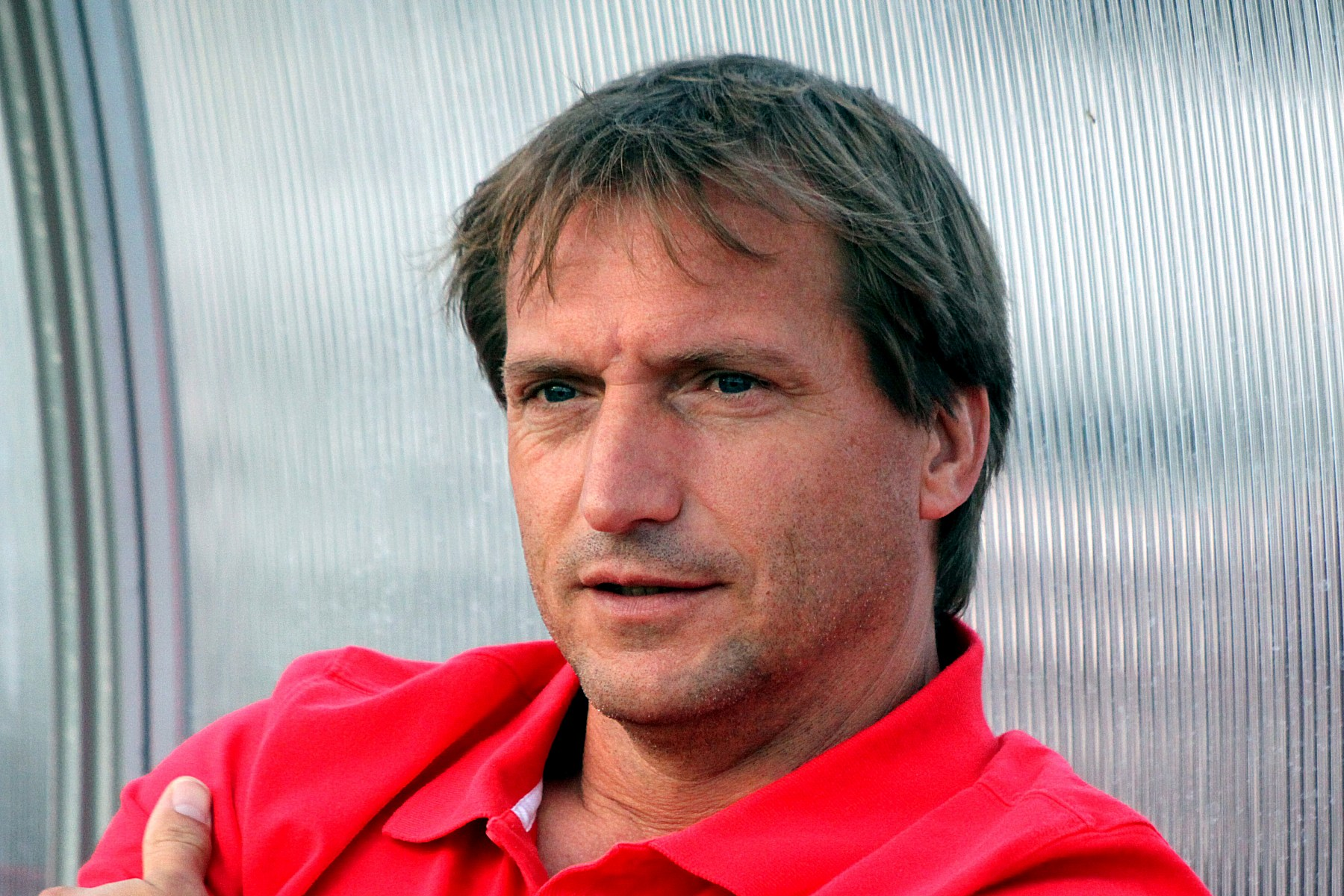
- Westerthaler in 2012

Personal information
- Date of birth: 11 January 1965
- Place of birth: Silz, Austria
- Date of death: 20 July 2018 (aged 53)
- Height: 1.70 m (5 ft 7 in)
- Positions: Midfielder; striker

Youth career
- 1973–1983: SPG Silz/Mötz

Senior career*
Years	Team	Apps	(Gls)
1983–1986	FC Wacker Innsbruck	30	(7)
1986–1988	LASK Linz	53	(18)
1988–1994	FC Swarovski Tirol	167	(66)
1994–1995	SK Vorwärts Steyr	49	(14)
1996–1997	LASK Linz	47	(13)
1997	APOEL Nicosia	0	(0)
1998–1999	Eintracht Frankfurt	47	(8)
2000	FSV Frankfurt	33	(26)
2001	VfL Osnabrück	7	(0)
Total		433	(152)

International career
1989–1993	Austria	6	(0)

Managerial career
- 2002–2005: FC Wacker Tirol (assistant)
- 2005–2007: Innsbrucker AC
- 2008: SV Völs
- 2011–2014: SV Horn (assistant)
- 2014–2015: SV Horn
- 2015–2016: SV Horn (assistant)
- 2016: SV Horn (interim)
- 2016–2017: SV Horn (assistant)
- 2017: SV Horn (interim)
- * Club domestic league appearances and goals

Christoph Westerthaler (11 January 1965 – 20 July 2018) was an Austrian football coach and player.

== Club career ==
Nicknamed Gischi, Westerthaler was a small-built striker who started his professional career at FC Wacker Innsbruck and stayed with them for nine years, split by a two-season period at LASK Linz. With the Tyrolean side he won two league titles and two domestic cups. In 1994, he moved to SK Vorwärts Steyr only to rejoin LASK two years later. In 1997, he moved abroad and played in Germany for the two major Frankfurt teams and VfL Osnabrück.

In the summer of 2001 he finished his career as a player because of a knee cartilage damage.

== International career ==
Westerthaler made his debut for Austria in an October 1989 friendly match against Malta but was not considered for the 1990 FIFA World Cup. He earned 6 caps, no goals scored. His final international game was a November 1993 World Cup qualification match against Sweden.

== Death ==
On 20 July 2018, Westerthaler died at the age of 53, due to a heart attack.

== Honours ==
- Austrian Bundesliga: 1989, 1990
- Austrian Cup: 1989, 1993
- Austrian Bundesliga top goalscorer: 1992
