= Alfred Hörtnagl =

Austrian footballer

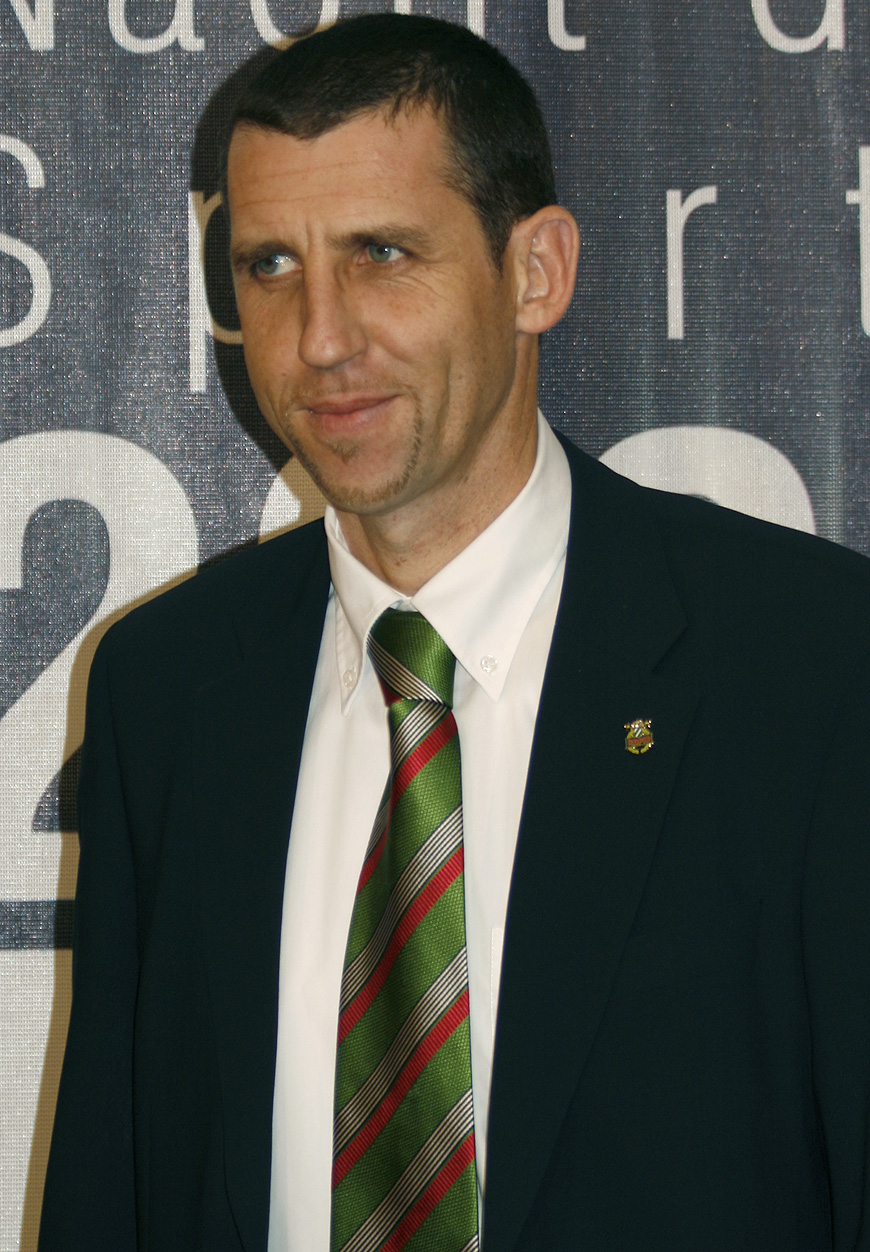

Personal information
- Full name: Alfred Hörtnagl
- Date of birth: 24 September 1966 (age 60)
- Place of birth: Matrei am Brenner, Austria
- Height: 1.82 m (5 ft 11 1/2 in)
- Position: Midfielder

Youth career
- 1973–1981: SV Matrei am Brenner
- 1981–1985: BJLZ Tirol

Senior career*
Years	Team	Apps	(Gls)
1985–1986	SSW Innsbruck	31	(2)
1986–1990	FC Swarovski Tirol	156	(13)
1990–1992	Admira/Wacker	32	(3)
1992–1993	Rapid Wien	24	(2)
1993–1994	Sturm Graz	15	(1)
1994–1996	Kavala	25	(5)
1996–1997	APOEL	8	(2)
1997	FC Tirol Innsbruck	129	(9)
1998–2002	SPG Wattens/Wacker Tirol		
2002–2003	FC Wacker Tirol	52	(3)

International career
1989–2001	Austria	27	(1)
- * Club domestic league appearances and goals

Alfred Hörtnagl (born 24 September 1966 in Matrei am Brenner) is a retired Austrian football player.

== Club career ==
Born in Tyrol, the defensive midfielder played mostly for Tirol Innsbruck. Also he played for Austrian big clubs Rapid Wien and Sturm Graz as well as a short period in Greece and Cyprus.

== International career ==
He made his debut for Austria in 1989 and was a participant at the 1990 FIFA World Cup where he played in two matches. He earned 27 caps, scoring one goal. His last international was a September 2001 World Cup qualification match against Spain.

=== International goals ===
Scores and results list Austria's goal tally first.

#	Date	Venue	Opponent	Score	Result	Competition
1.	28 March 1990	Estadio La Rosaleda, Málaga	Spain	1–2	3–2	Friendly

== Honours ==
- Austrian Football Bundesliga (5):
  - 1989, 1990, 2000, 2001, 2002
- Austrian Cup (3):
  - 1989, 1993, 1996
