= Christian Keglevits =

Austrian footballer

Personal information
- Full name: Christian Keglevits
- Date of birth: 29 January 1961 (age 65)
- Place of birth: Weiden bei Rechnitz, Austria
- Height: 1.77 m (5 ft 10 in)
- Position: Striker

Youth career
- Schachendorf

Senior career*
Years	Team	Apps	(Gls)
1976–1979	SC Eisenstadt		
1979–1984	Rapid Wien	143	(36)
1984–1989	Wiener Sportclub	129	(54)
1989–1991	Rapid Wien	54	(19)
1991–1992	Austria Salzburg	31	(11)
1992–1993	LASK Linz	22	(7)
1993–1994	Wiener Sportclub	26	(2)

International career
1980–1991	Austria	18	(3)

Managerial career
- 1996–1997: SV Gerasdorf/Stammersdorf
- 1997–2000: Floridsdorfer AC
- 2001: Grazer AK (interim manager)
- 2002: Grazer AK (interim manager)
- 2007–2008: SV Stockerau
- 2008: SV Haitzendorf
- * Club domestic league appearances and goals

Christian Keglevits (born 29 January 1961 in Weiden bei Rechnitz) is a retired Austrian footballer.

== Club career ==
He started his career at SC Eisenstadt and also played for SK Rapid Wien, Wiener Sportclub, LASK Linz and SV Austria Salzburg. With Rapid he won two league titles and two domestic cups.

== International career ==
He earned 18 caps and scored 3 goals for the Austria national football team from 1980 to 1991, 3 games of those in World Cup qualification matches, and participated in the 1990 FIFA World Cup. His last international was a November 1991 European Championship qualification match against Yugoslavia.

== Honours ==
- Austrian Football Bundesliga (2):
  - 1982, 1983
- Austrian Cup (2):
  - 1983, 1984
