= Sulejman Halilović =

Bosnian footballer (born 1955)

Personal information
- Full name: Sulejman Halilović
- Date of birth: 14 November 1955 (age 70)
- Place of birth: Odžak, FPR Yugoslavia
- Height: 1.75 m (5 ft 9 in)
- Position: Forward

Youth career
- 1972–1977: Jedinstvo Odžak

Senior career*
| Years | Team | Apps | (Gls) |
| 1977–1984 | Dinamo Vinkovci | 149 | (109) |
| 1984–1985 | Red Star Belgrade | 30 | (18) |
| 1985–1988 | Rapid Wien | 80 | (24) |
| 1988–1990 | Sloga Doboj | | |

International career
| 1983–1984 | Yugoslavia | 12 | (1) |
- * Club domestic league appearances and goals

Sulejman Halilović (born 14 November 1955) is a Bosnian former professional footballer who played as a forward.

== Club career ==
During his club career, Halilović played for Dinamo Vinkovci, Red Star Belgrade, Rapid Wien and Sloga Doboj.

== International career ==
Halilović made his debut for Yugoslavia in a friendly game away against France on 23 April 1983. He has earned a total of 12 caps, scoring 1 goal. He participated in the UEFA Euro 1984 tournament. His final international game was a match against Denmark in Euro 1984 on 16 June 1984.

== Honours ==
Individual

- Yugoslav First League top goalscorer: 1982–83
