= Heinz Peischl =

Austrian footballer and manager

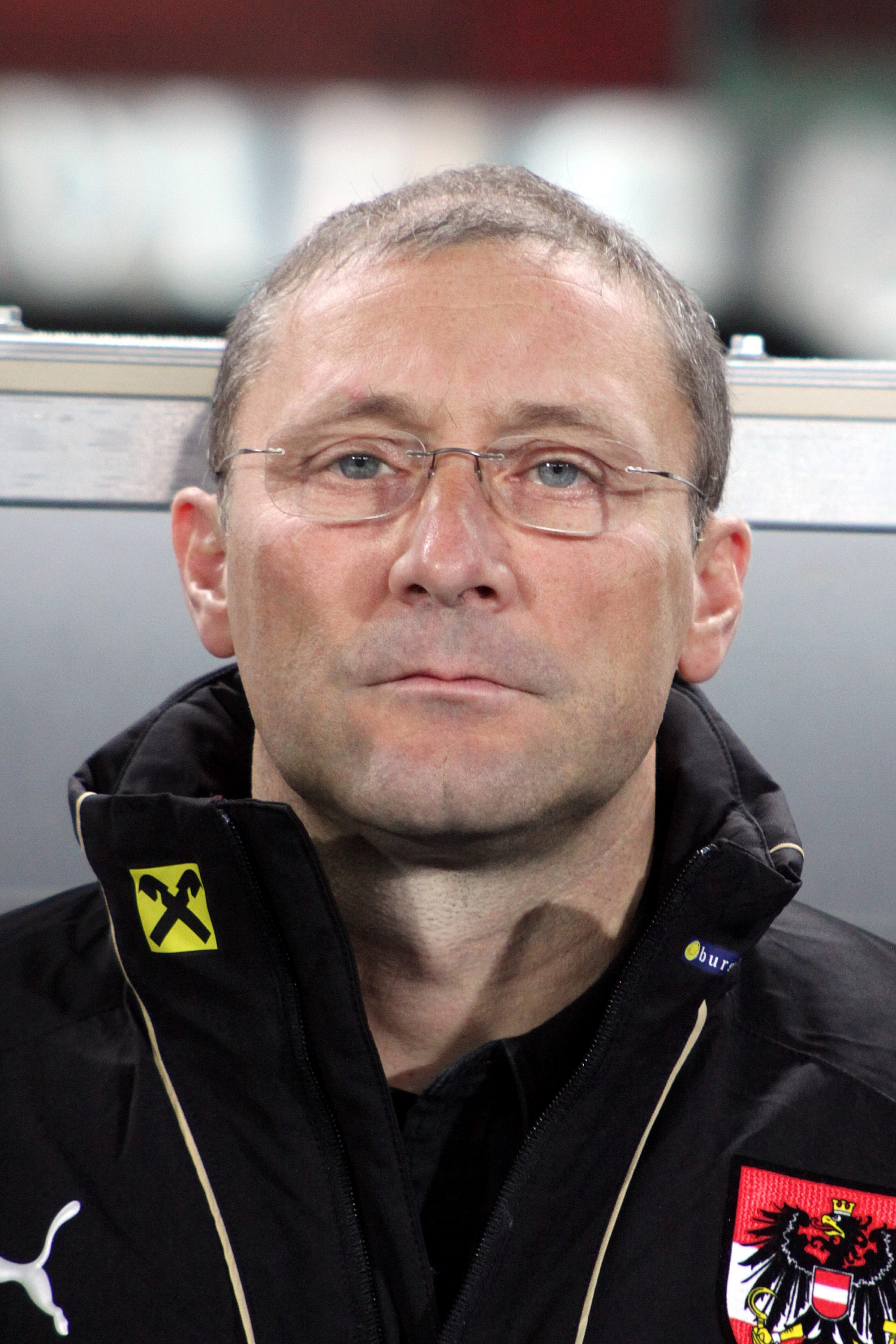
- Assistant coach of the Austria national football team, 2009

Personal information
- Date of birth: 9 December 1963 (age 62)
- Place of birth: Ollersdorf
- Position: Midfielder

Senior career*
Years	Team	Apps	(Gls)
1981–1982	SV Ollersdorf		
1982–1985	SC Eisenstadt		
1985–1992	FC Swarovski Tirol		
1992	FC Stahl Linz		
1993	FC Wacker Innsbruck		
1993	Club Atlético San Lorenzo de Almagro		
1993	FC Schaan		
1994	1. Wiener Neustädter SC		
1994–1995	FC Tirol Innsbruck		

International career
1990–1991	Austria	3	(0)

Managerial career
- 1995–1999: FC Tirol Innsbruck (assistant)
- 2001–2002: FC Wil 1900
- 2003–2005: FC St. Gallen
- 2006–2007: FC Thun
- 2007–2008: ASK Schwadorf
- 2008: FC Trenkwalder Admira
- 2009–2010: Austria (assistant)
- * Club domestic league appearances and goals

Heinz Peischl (born 9 December 1963) is a retired Austrian football midfielder and later manager.
