= Kurt Garger =

Austrian footballer and manager

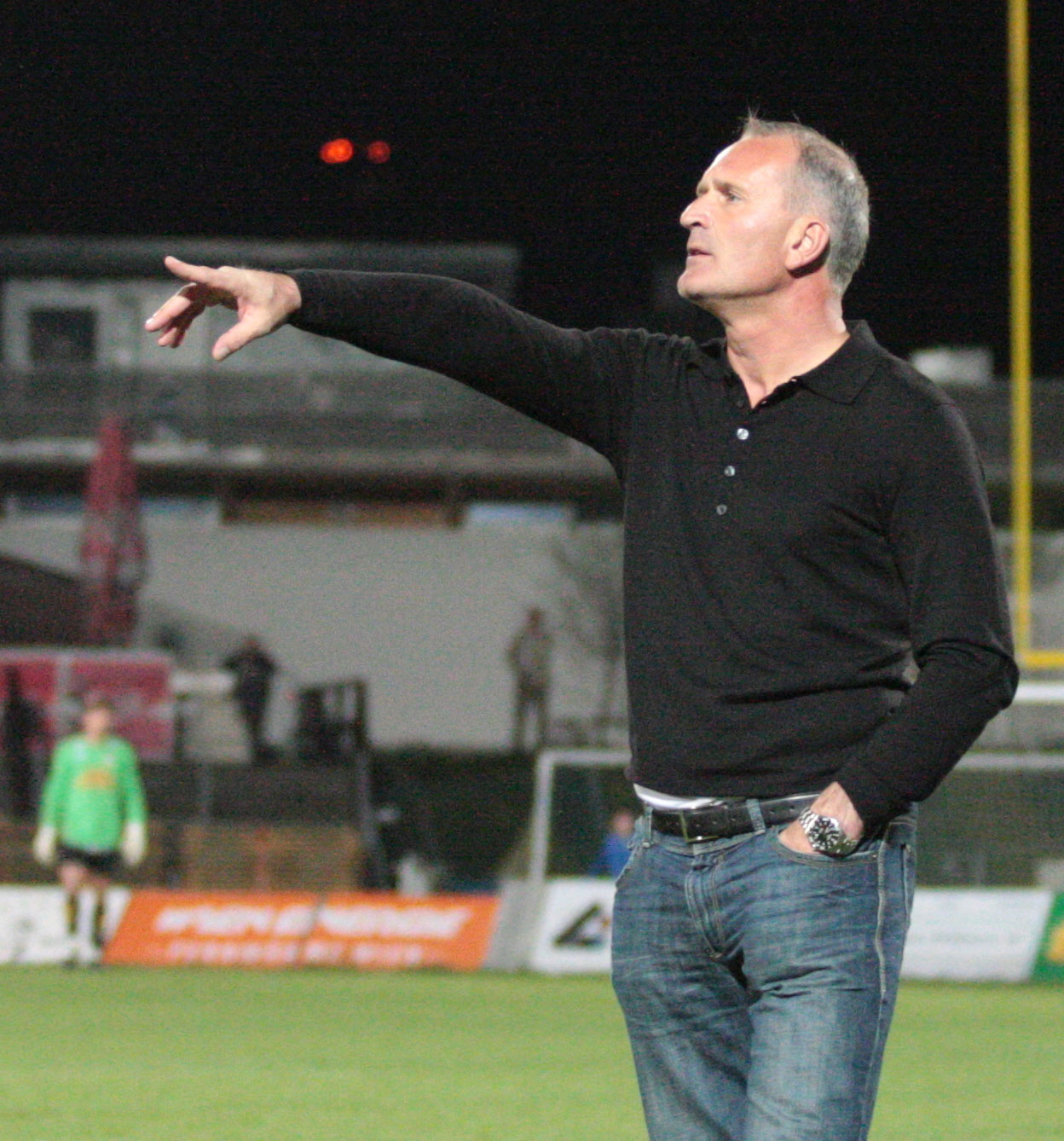

Personal information
- Date of birth: 15 September 1960 (age 66)
- Place of birth: Strem, Austria
- Height: 1.85 m (6 ft 1 in)
- Position: Centre-back

Youth career
- SV Güssing

Senior career*
Years	Team	Apps	(Gls)
1979–1988	Rapid Wien	246	(5)
1988–1990	Swarovski Tirol	52	(5)
1990–1994	SV Austria Salzburg	128	(5)
1994–1995	Rapid Wien	8	(1)
1995–1996	SV Gerasdorf/Stammersdorf	10	(0)

International career
	Austria	1	(0)

Managerial career
- 1996: SV Gerasdorf
- 1996–1997: FC Admira Wacker
- 1997–1998: SV Gerasdorf
- 1998–2001: VSE St. Pölten
- 2001–2004: First Vienna
- 2004–2005: SC Eisenstadt
- 2005–2007: SC-ESV Parndorf 1919
- 2008–2009: SC-ESV Parndorf 1919
- 2009–2010: FK DAC 1904 Dunajská Streda
- 2011–2012: TSV Hartberg
- 2013–2014: First Vienna
- 2016–2017: SV Stripfing
- 2017–2018: Yunnan Lijiang
- * Club domestic league appearances and goals

Kurt Garger (born 15 September 1960) is an Austrian football manager and former player.
