= Leo Lainer =

Austrian footballer

Personal information
- Date of birth: 10 September 1960 (age 66)
- Place of birth: Maishofen, Austria
- Position: Defender

Team information
- Current team: FC Red Bull Salzburg (scout)

Youth career
- SE Maishofen

Senior career*
Years	Team	Apps	(Gls)
1978–1982	SV Austria Salzburg	86	(8)
1982–1988	SK Rapid Wien	169	(19)
1988–1990	FC Swarovski Tirol	66	(11)
1990–1997	Casino Salzburg	186	(15)

International career
1982–1994	Austria	28	(1)

Managerial career
- 2003–2005: SV Pasching (assistant)
- 2006–: FC Red Bull Salzburg (scout)
- * Club domestic league appearances and goals

Leopold "Leo" Lainer (born 10 September 1960) is an Austrian former professional footballer who played as a defender, making more than 500 appearances in the Austrian Bundesliga. He made 28 appearances for the Austria national team, scoring once.

He later worked in management and as a scout with FC Red Bull Salzburg.

His son Stefan Lainer is also a professional footballer.

== Career statistics ==
Scores and results list Austria's goal tally first.

No	Date	Venue	Opponent	Score	Result	Competition
1.	16 October 1991	Windsor Park, Belfast, Northern Ireland	Northern Ireland	1–2	1–2	Euro 1992 qualifier

== Honours ==
- Austrian Football Bundesliga: 1983, 1987, 1988, 1989, 1990, 1994, 1995, 1997
- Austrian Cup: 1983, 1984, 1985, 1987, 1989
- UEFA Cup Winners' Cup finalist: 1985
- UEFA Cup finalist: 1994
