= 1989–90 Austrian Football Bundesliga =

72nd season of top-tier football league in Austria

Austrian Bundesliga
- Season: 1989–90
- Champions: FC Swarovski Tirol

Statistics of Austrian Football Bundesliga in the 1989–90 season.

== Overview ==
Fall season was contested by 12 teams, and higher eight teams go into Meister playoff. Lower four teams fought in Mittlere Playoff with higher four teams of Austrian Football First League.

FC Swarovski Tirol won the championship.

=== Teams and location ===
Location of teams in the 1989–90 Austrian Football Bundesliga

Teams of 1989–90 Austrian Football Bundesliga

- FC Admira/Wacker
- Austria Salzburg
- Austria Wien
- First Vienna
- Grazer AK
- Kremser SC
- Rapid Wien
- Sankt Pölten
- Swarovski Tirol
- Sturm Graz
- Vorwärts Steyr
- Wiener Sport-Club

== Autumn season ==
=== Table ===
Pos	Team	Pld	W	D	L	GF	GA	GD	Pts
1	Swarovski Tirol	22	13	8	1	44	21	+23	34
2	Austria Wien	22	14	3	5	50	25	+25	31
3	Admira/Wacker	22	13	3	6	58	38	+20	29
4	Rapid Wien	22	11	6	5	44	30	+14	28
5	Sturm Graz	22	6	11	5	23	17	+6	23
6	First Vienna	22	7	7	8	38	40	−2	21
7	Austria Salzburg	22	5	11	6	29	31	−2	21
8	VSE St. Pölten	22	7	7	8	25	31	−6	21
9	Kremser SC	22	7	6	9	32	33	−1	20
10	Vorwärts Steyr	22	3	8	11	22	40	−18	14
11	Wiener SC	22	4	3	15	19	46	−27	11
12	Grazer AK	22	4	3	15	16	48	−32	11

Source: rsssf.com

=== Results ===
Home \ Away	ADM	ASZ	AWI	FIR	GAK	KRE	RWI	STU	SWA	VOR	StP	WIE
Admira/Wacker		5–2	3–1	3–3	5–0	4–0	4–1	1–0	1–3	4–0	3–1	5–1
Austria Salzburg	2–3		2–2	0–0	0–0	3–0	2–2	0–0	1–1	1–1	1–1	1–3
Austria Wien	6–0	2–0		3–0	1–0	3–0	1–4	2–1	0–0	3–1	0–0	3–0
First Vienna	0–6	3–2	0–2		7–1	1–0	2–1	1–1	1–3	4–1	4–0	2–1
Grazer AK	4–4	1–1	0–5	1–0		0–1	0–3	0–4	0–1	2–0	0–2	0–1
Kremser SC	5–0	0–1	2–3	3–1	2–1		3–3	1–1	1–4	0–0	1–1	5–0
Rapid Wien	1–0	1–4	5–2	4–4	1–0	3–1		3–0	0–2	3–0	3–0	1–0
Sturm Graz	3–0	0–0	0–2	1–1	0–1	0–0	0–0		0–0	2–1	1–0	2–1
Swarovski Tirol	2–1	3–1	4–2	2–0	4–1	0–3	2–2	2–2		0–0	1–1	3–1
Vorwärts Steyr	1–1	1–2	1–5	2–2	2–0	3–1	0–1	1–1	2–2		1–1	0–1
VSE St. Pölten	1–2	1–1	2–1	2–1	2–0	1–1	2–1	0–4	1–2	3–0		2–3
Wiener SC	1–3	1–2	0–1	1–1	2–4	0–2	1–1	0–0	0–3	1–4	0–1	

Legend: Blue = home team win; Yellow = draw; Red = away team win.

== Spring season ==
=== Championship playoff ===
==== Table ====
Pos	Team	Pld	W	D	L	GF	GA	GD	Pts
1	Swarovski Tirol	36	23	9	4	78	37	+41	38
2	Austria Wien	36	20	5	11	70	46	+24	30
3	Rapid Wien	36	17	10	9	69	52	+17	30
4	Admira/Wacker	36	17	8	11	79	56	+23	28
5	Sturm Graz	36	10	16	10	34	30	+4	25
6	Austria Salzburg	36	10	15	11	49	52	−3	25
7	VSE St. Pölten	36	9	16	11	45	54	−9	24
8	First Vienna	36	10	9	17	51	70	−19	19

Source: rsssf.com

==== Results ====
Home \ Away	ADM	ASZ	AWI	FIR	RWI	StP	STU	SWA
Admira/Wacker		6–1	1–0	5–1	0–2	1–1	1–3	3–1
Austria Salzburg	3–2		5–0	2–0	1–0	1–1	0–0	2–0
Austria Wien	2–0	1–0		3–0	0–0	1–0	3–0	0–1
First Vienna	0–0	3–1	0–4		0–2	0–1	0–1	0–4
Rapid Wien	1–1	2–1	6–3	0–3		6–3	2–0	0–1
VSE St. Pölten	1–1	1–1	1–1	4–4	2–2		2–0	0–0
Sturm Graz	0–0	0–0	2–0	1–2	1–1	0–0		2–0
Swarovski Tirol	2–0	5–2	5–2	2–0	6–1	5–3	2–1	

Legend: Blue = home team win; Yellow = draw; Red = away team win.

=== Promotion/relegation playoff ===
==== Table ====
Pos	Team	Pld	W	D	L	GF	GA	GD	Pts
1	Vorwärts Steyr	14	11	0	3	29	14	+15	22
2	Wiener SC	14	6	3	5	20	18	+2	15
3	Kremser SC	14	5	5	4	18	17	+1	15
4	Donawitzer SV Alpine (Note: Belongs to Austrian Football First League)	14	6	2	6	16	15	+1	14
5	VOEST Linz	14	3	7	4	19	18	+1	13
6	VfB Mödling	14	5	3	6	21	22	−1	13
7	Grazer AK	14	4	3	7	18	25	−7	11
8	Spittal an der Drau	14	3	3	8	13	25	−12	9

Source: rsssf.com

==== Results ====
Home \ Away	DON	GAK	KRE	SPI	MÖD	VOE	VOR	WIE
Donawitzer SV Alpine		1–2	2–0	1–0	3–1	1–1	3–0	0–1
Grazer AK	2–1		4–0	1–2	1–2	1–1	3–0	0–1
Kremser SC	4–0	2–0		0–0	0–0	2–0	1–2	2–1
Spittal an der Drau	3–2	1–1	0–2		1–0	1–1	0–2	3–4
VfB Mödling	0–1	4–1	3–3	3–1		4–3	1–3	2–0
VOEST Linz	0–0	1–1	1–1	5–1	1–0		1–2	2–0
Vorwärts Steyr	0–1	3–1	3–0	2–0	3–0	3–1		4–1
Wiener SC	1–0	6–0	1–1	1–0	1–1	1–1	1–2	

Legend: Blue = home team win; Yellow = draw; Red = away team win.
