= 1988–89 Austrian Football Bundesliga =

71st season of top-tier football league in Austria

Austrian Bundesliga
- Season: 1988–89
- Champions: FC Swarovski Tirol

Statistics of Austrian Football Bundesliga in the 1988–89 season.

== Overview ==
Fall season was contested by 12 teams, and higher eight teams go into Meister playoff. Lower four teams fought in Mittlere Playoff with higher four teams of Austrian Football First League.

FC Swarovski Tirol won the championship.

=== Teams and location ===
Location of teams in the 1988–89 Austrian Football Bundesliga

Teams of 1988–89 Austrian Football Bundesliga

- FC Admira/Wacker
- Austria Wien
- First Vienna
- Grazer AK
- Kärnten
- LASK
- Rapid Wien
- Sankt Pölten
- Swarovski Tirol
- Sturm Graz
- Vorwärts Steyr
- Wiener Sport-Club

== Autumn season ==
=== Table ===
| Pos | Team | Pld | W | D | L | GF | GA | GD | Pts |
|---|---|---|---|---|---|---|---|---|---|
| 1 | Swarovski Tirol | 22 | 15 | 3 | 4 | 50 | 25 | +25 | 33 |
| 2 | Admira/Wacker | 22 | 13 | 5 | 4 | 45 | 27 | +18 | 31 |
| 3 | Austria Wien | 22 | 12 | 6 | 4 | 54 | 26 | +28 | 30 |
| 4 | VSE St. Pölten | 22 | 10 | 5 | 7 | 34 | 34 | 0 | 25 |
| 5 | Rapid Wien | 22 | 10 | 4 | 8 | 35 | 26 | +9 | 24 |
| 6 | First Vienna | 22 | 6 | 10 | 6 | 31 | 34 | −3 | 22 |
| 7 | Grazer AK | 22 | 7 | 8 | 7 | 27 | 37 | −10 | 22 |
| 8 | Wiener SC | 22 | 8 | 4 | 10 | 40 | 43 | −3 | 20 |
| 9 | Vorwärts Steyr | 22 | 5 | 8 | 9 | 21 | 31 | −10 | 18 |
| 10 | Austria Klagenfurt | 22 | 5 | 6 | 11 | 29 | 47 | −18 | 16 |
| 11 | Sturm Graz | 22 | 3 | 6 | 13 | 21 | 35 | −14 | 12 |
| 12 | Linzer ASK | 22 | 3 | 5 | 14 | 21 | 43 | −22 | 11 |

Source: rsssf.com

=== Results ===
| Home \ Away | ADM | KLA | AWI | FIR | GAK | LIN | RWI | STU | SWA | VOR | StP | WIE |
|---|---|---|---|---|---|---|---|---|---|---|---|---|
| Admira/Wacker | | 4–1 | 2–1 | 1–1 | 1–1 | 3–1 | 3–1 | 2–1 | 3–4 | 1–0 | 2–1 | 2–1 |
| Austria Klagenfurt | 4–3 | | 0–3 | 2–2 | 3–1 | 0–2 | 1–4 | 0–0 | 0–1 | 2–2 | 4–1 | 4–1 |
| Austria Wien | 4–2 | 3–0 | | 2–1 | 6–0 | 3–1 | 1–0 | 3–1 | 2–2 | 3–1 | 0–0 | 4–0 |
| First Vienna | 0–0 | 2–0 | 3–3 | | 2–4 | 2–1 | 2–2 | 3–2 | 5–1 | 3–2 | 0–2 | 1–2 |
| Grazer AK | 1–1 | 3–4 | 3–3 | 0–0 | | 2–0 | 3–1 | 0–4 | 0–3 | 3–1 | 1–1 | 3–2 |
| Linzer ASK | 0–2 | 1–1 | 0–0 | 1–1 | 0–1 | | 1–2 | 2–1 | 1–1 | 1–3 | 1–2 | 1–4 |
| Rapid Wien | 1–2 | 3–1 | 0–3 | 0–1 | 4–0 | 3–1 | | 1–0 | 1–0 | 1–0 | 4–0 | 1–1 |
| Sturm Graz | 1–5 | 0–0 | 2–1 | 1–1 | 0–1 | 2–3 | 0–0 | | 0–2 | 0–0 | 2–3 | 2–5 |
| Swarovski Tirol | 2–0 | 3–1 | 3–1 | 2–0 | 0–0 | 4–0 | 3–1 | 1–0 | | 3–0 | 4–2 | 1–3 |
| Vorwärts Steyr | 0–0 | 2–0 | 2–1 | 0–0 | 0–0 | 1–0 | 2–2 | 0–0 | 0–5 | | 2–0 | 1–1 |
| VSE St. Pölten | 1–4 | 1–1 | 1–1 | 6–1 | 1–0 | 1–1 | 1–0 | 1–0 | 1–3 | 2–0 | | 2–1 |
| Wiener SC | 0–2 | 3–0 | 2–6 | 0–0 | 0–0 | 4–2 | 0–3 | 1–2 | 4–0 | 3–2 | 2–4 | |

Legend: Blue = home team win; Yellow = draw; Red = away team win.

== Spring season ==
=== Championship playoff ===
==== Table ====
| Pos | Team | Pld | W | D | L | GF | GA | GD | Pts |
|---|---|---|---|---|---|---|---|---|---|
| 1 | Swarovski Tirol | 36 | 24 | 7 | 5 | 78 | 38 | +40 | 39 |
| 2 | Admira/Wacker | 36 | 20 | 8 | 8 | 78 | 52 | +26 | 33 |
| 3 | Austria Wien | 36 | 18 | 10 | 8 | 76 | 44 | +32 | 31 |
| 4 | Rapid Wien | 36 | 17 | 7 | 12 | 67 | 40 | +27 | 29 |
| 5 | First Vienna | 36 | 12 | 13 | 11 | 59 | 59 | 0 | 26 |
| 6 | Wiener SC | 36 | 13 | 6 | 17 | 60 | 70 | −10 | 22 |
| 7 | Grazer AK | 36 | 11 | 9 | 16 | 37 | 64 | −27 | 20 |
| 8 | VSE St. Pölten | 36 | 10 | 9 | 17 | 44 | 68 | −24 | 17 |

Source: rsssf.com

==== Results ====
| Home \ Away | ADM | AWI | FIR | GAK | RWI | SWA | StP | WIE |
|---|---|---|---|---|---|---|---|---|
| Admira/Wacker | | 4–1 | 0–2 | 5–0 | 3–2 | 0–1 | 7–3 | 3–1 |
| Austria Wien | 1–1 | | 2–1 | 5–0 | 2–1 | 1–1 | 2–0 | 2–0 |
| First Vienna | 3–1 | 3–2 | | 3–0 | 0–5 | 0–4 | 5–0 | 5–0 |
| Grazer AK | 1–2 | 1–2 | 1–0 | | 0–0 | 0–1 | 4–0 | 2–0 |
| Rapid Wien | 1–2 | 0–0 | 5–1 | 3–0 | | 2–3 | 4–0 | 1–1 |
| Swarovski Tirol | 2–2 | 2–0 | 1–1 | 4–1 | 1–3 | | 3–2 | 2–1 |
| VSE St. Pölten | 1–1 | 1–1 | 2–2 | 0–1 | 1–2 | 0–0 | | 0–2 |
| Wiener SC | 6–2 | 3–1 | 2–2 | 2–1 | 0–3 | 0–3 | 2–0 | |

Legend: Blue = home team win; Yellow = draw; Red = away team win.

=== Promotion/relegation playoff ===
==== Table ====
| Pos | Team | Pld | W | D | L | GF | GA | GD | Pts |
|---|---|---|---|---|---|---|---|---|---|
| 1 | Sturm Graz | 14 | 9 | 3 | 2 | 32 | 13 | +19 | 21 |
| 2 | Vorwärts Steyr | 14 | 7 | 5 | 2 | 26 | 17 | +9 | 19 |
| 3 | Austria Salzburg (Note: Belongs to Austrian Football First League) | 14 | 8 | 1 | 5 | 18 | 20 | −2 | 17 |
| 4 | Kremser SC | 14 | 7 | 2 | 5 | 24 | 17 | +7 | 16 |
| 5 | Linzer ASK | 14 | 6 | 2 | 6 | 22 | 20 | +2 | 14 |
| 6 | Austria Klagenfurt | 14 | 5 | 3 | 6 | 21 | 24 | −3 | 13 |
| 7 | Flavia Solva Wagna | 14 | 3 | 3 | 8 | 9 | 25 | −16 | 9 |
| 8 | Kufstein | 14 | 1 | 1 | 12 | 12 | 28 | −16 | 3 |

Source: rsssf.com

==== Results ====
| Home \ Away | KLA | ASZ | FLA | KRE | KUF | LIN | STU | VOR |
|---|---|---|---|---|---|---|---|---|
| Austria Klagenfurt | | 4–0 | 0–0 | 2–1 | 1–1 | 1–0 | 0–2 | 2–6 |
| Austria Salzburg | 2–1 | | 0–1 | 1–0 | 3–2 | 2–1 | 0–3 | 1–0 |
| Flavia Solva Wagna | 3–3 | 1–2 | | 0–2 | 1–0 | 0–5 | 1–1 | 0–1 |
| Kremser SC | 2–3 | 0–3 | 4–0 | | 2–1 | 2–0 | 1–2 | 3–3 |
| Kufstein | 1–2 | 0–2 | 0–1 | 0–2 | | 0–2 | 1–2 | 1–2 |
| Linzer ASK | 1–0 | 2–0 | 2–0 | 1–3 | 1–4 | | 2–2 | 3–0 |
| Sturm Graz | 2–0 | 3–0 | 2–1 | 1–2 | 5–1 | 5–1 | | 0–0 |
| Vorwärts Steyr | 3–2 | 2–2 | 3–0 | 0–0 | 2–0 | 1–1 | 3–2 | |

Legend: Blue = home team win; Yellow = draw; Red = away team win.
