= FC Swarovski Tirol =

Austrian football club, based in Innsbruck

Swarovski Tirol
- Full name: Fußballclub Swarovski Tirol
- Founded: 1986; 40 years ago
- Dissolved: 1992; 34 years ago
- League: Austrian Bundesliga
- 1991–92: 3rd

FC Swarovski Tirol was an Austrian association football club from 1986 to 1992, based in Innsbruck, Tyrol, Austria.

A year later, FC Tirol Innsbruck was founded and it was considered the continuation of the club.

== History ==
It was created by crystal manufacturer Swarovski as a split-off of FC Wacker Innsbruck, whose Bundesliga license it adopted at the end of the 1985–86 season. With manager Ernst Happel it won the Austrian football championship of 1989 and 1990 as well as the Austrian Cup in 1989. It nevertheless was dissolved in 1992 and the license fell back to FC Wacker, only to change over again to the newly established FC Tirol Innsbruck one year later.

== Honours ==
- Austrian Championship (2): 1988–89, 1989–90
- Austrian Championship Runners-up (1): 1990–91
- Austrian Cup (1): 1988–89
- Austrian Cup Runners-up (2): 1986–87, 1987–88
- Austrian Supercup Runners-up (3): 1987, 1989, 1990

== European Cup history ==
- Q = Qualifying QF = Quarterfinal SF = Semifinal

Season	Competition	Round	Country	Club	Home	Away	Aggregate
1986–87	UEFA Cup	1	(Bulgaria)	CSKA Sofia	3–0	0–2	3–2
		2	(Belgium)	Standard Liège	2–1	3–2	4–3
		3	(Soviet Union)	Spartak Moscow	2–0	0–1	2–1
		QF	(Italy)	Torino	2–1	0–0	2–1
		SF	(Sweden)	IFK Göteborg	0–1	1–4	1–5
1987–88	European Cup Winners' Cup	1	(Portugal)	Sporting Lisbon	4–2	0–4	4–6
1989–90	European Champion Clubs' Cup	1	(Cyprus)	Omonia Nicosia	6–0	3–2	9–2
		2	(Soviet Union)	Dnepr Dnepropetrovsk	0–2	2–2	2–4
1990–91	European Champion Clubs' Cup	1	(Finland)	Kuusysi Lahti	5–0	2–1	7–1
		2	(Spain)	Real Madrid	2–2	1–9	3–11
1991–92	UEFA Cup	1	(Norway)	Tromsø	2–1	1–1	3–2
		2	(Greece)	PAOK Thessaloniki	2–0	2–0	4–0
		3	(England)	Liverpool	0–2	0–4	0–6

== Manager history ==
- (Austria) Felix Latzke (1 July 1985 – 30 June 1987)
- (Austria) Ernst Happel (1 July 1987 – 1 Dec 1991)
- (Germany) Horst Hrubesch (1 Jan 1992 – 31 May 1992)
