= 1989–90 SK Rapid Wien season =

Rapid Wien
1989–90 season
- President: Heinz Holzbach
- Coach: Hans Krankl
- Stadium: Gerhard Hanappi Stadium, Vienna, Austria
- Bundesliga: 3rd
- ÖFB-Cup: Runner-up
- UEFA Cup: 3rd round
- Top goalscorer: League: Jan Åge Fjørtoft (17); All: Jan Åge Fjørtoft (23)
- Highest home attendance: 20,000
- Lowest home attendance: 1,500

The 1989–90 SK Rapid Wien season was the 92nd season in club history.

== Squad ==
=== Squad statistics ===
No.	Nat.	Name	Age	League		Cup		UEFA Cup		Total		Discipline	
No.	Nat.	Name	Age	Apps	Goals	Apps	Goals	Apps	Goals	Apps	Goals	Booked	Sent off (straight red)
Goalkeepers
1	(Austria)	Andreas Koch	22	2		1		1		4		1	
1	(Austria)	Michael Konsel	27	34		5		5		44		5	1
Defenders
2	(Austria)	Martin Puza	19	1+2						1+2		1	
4	(Austria)	Robert Pecl	23	22	1	4		4		30	1	10	4
6	(Austria)	Reinhard Kienast	29	33	3	4		6		43	3	9	
8	(Austria)	Franz Blizenec	22	26+4		3+1		6		35+5		7	
14	(Austria)	Herbert Gager	19	0+3						0+3		1	
15	(Austria)	Karl Brauneder	29	27+1		3+1		4+1		34+3		11	
18	(Austria)	Andreas Poiger	21	7+11		4+1		0+2		11+14			
Midfielders
3	(Austria)	Franz Weber	24	24+5	2	3+1		3+2		30+8	2	3	
5	(Austria)	Peter Schöttel	22	33	1	5		6		44	1	14	
7	(Austria)	Christian Keglevits	28	25+2	9	4	2	4+1	3	33+3	14	5	
9	(Socialist Federal Republic of Yugoslavia)	Zlatko Kranjcar	32	21+6	8	4	3	5+1	2	30+7	13	5	
10	(Austria)	Andreas Herzog	20	27	8	3		6		36	8	3	
12	(Socialist Federal Republic of Yugoslavia)	Mladen Munjakovic	27			0+1				0+1			
13	(Austria)	Franz Resch	20	9+3		3+1	1	0+1		12+5	1	4	
14	(Austria)	Günther Jerabek	21	0+2		1+1				1+3			
16	(Austria)	Andreas Reisinger	25	27+2	3	5+1	1	6		38+3	4	1	
20	(Austria)	Horst Steiger	19	13+13	1	3+2				16+15	1	2	
Forwards
11	(Norway)	Jan Åge Fjørtoft	22	31+3	17	5	3	6	3	42+3	23	7	
17	(Austria)	Heimo Pfeifenberger	22	33+2	13	6	5	4+2	2	43+4	20	4	1
18	(Austria)	Andreas Huyer	20	0+1						0+1			
19	(Austria)	Gerhard Karoly	18	0+1						0+1			
19	(Austria)	Peter Wurz	21	1+3	1	0+1				1+4	1	1	

== Fixtures and results ==
Win Draw Loss

=== League ===
Rd	Date	Venue	Opponent	Res.	Att.	Goals and discipline
1	21.07.1989	H	VSE St. Pölten	3-0	9,000	Weber F. 28', Fjørtoft 29', Pfeifenberger 90'
2	25.07.1989	A	Admira	1-4	13,000	Fjørtoft 55'
3	28.07.1989	H	Swarovski Tirol	0-2	20,000	
4	01.08.1989	A	GAK	3-0	7,000	Fjørtoft 2', Kienast R. 20', Herzog 47'
5	05.08.1989	H	Vienna	4-4	6,682	Kranjcar 4' 63', Pfeifenberger 48', Herzog 76'
6	11.08.1989	A	Austria Wien	4-1	25,000	Degeorgi 7' (o.g.), Kranjcar 40' 85', Pfeifenberger 68'
7	15.08.1989	H	Kremser SC	3-1	7,500	Pfeifenberger 16', Kranjcar 35', Fjørtoft 74'
8	26.08.1989	A	Austria Salzburg	2-2	15,000	Kranjcar 59', Fjørtoft 63'
9	29.08.1989	H	Steyr	3-0	5,500	Kienast R. 45', Fjørtoft 47', Reisinger A. 72'
10	09.09.1989	A	Sturm Graz	0-0	9,000	
11	16.09.1989	H	Wiener SC	1-0	4,000	Fjørtoft 16'
12	22.09.1989	A	Wiener SC	1-1	2,600	Fjørtoft 58'
13	30.09.1989	A	VSE St. Pölten	1-2	6,000	Fjørtoft 14'
14	07.10.1989	H	Admira	1-0	4,200	Steiger 28'
15	10.10.1989	A	Swarovski Tirol	2-2	13,000	Pfeifenberger 74', Keglevits 79'
16	14.10.1989	H	GAK	1-0	4,600	Fjørtoft 74'
17	28.10.1989	A	Vienna	1-2	5,000	Reisinger A. 10'; Konsel (red card) 86'
18	04.11.1989	H	Austria Wien	5-2	8,000	Pecl 22', Herzog 41', Keglevits 61', Fjørtoft 64' 76'; Pecl (red card) 45'
19	28.11.1989	A	Kremser SC	3-3	4,000	Keglevits 21', Pfeifenberger 45', Fjørtoft 68'
20	18.11.1989	H	Austria Salzburg	1-4	4,000	Keglevits 73'
21	25.11.1989	A	Steyr	1-0	2,500	Kranjcar 37' (pen.)
22	02.12.1989	H	Sturm Graz	3-0	1,500	Pfeifenberger 39', Weber F. 57', Keglevits 75'
23	17.02.1990	A	Vienna	2-0	5,000	Pfeifenberger 3', Fjørtoft 76'
24	24.02.1990	H	Sturm Graz	2-0	5,500	Reisinger A. 24', Pfeifenberger 62'
25	03.03.1990	A	VSE St. Pölten	2-2	3,500	Pfeifenberger 3', Herzog 35'
26	10.03.1990	H	Austria Wien	6-3	12,000	Herzog 13' (pen.), Fjørtoft 19' 83', Keglevits 22' 63', Schöttel 51'
27	17.03.1990	A	Austria Salzburg	0-1	16,000	
28	24.03.1990	H	Swarovski Tirol	0-1	18,500	
29	31.03.1990	A	Admira	2-0	7,000	Pfeifenberger 47' 80'
30	14.04.1990	A	Swarovski Tirol	1-6	15,000	Kranjcar 61' (pen.); Pecl (red card) 50'
31	06.04.1990	H	Admira	1-1	4,000	Fjørtoft 65'
32	20.04.1990	H	Austria Salzburg	2-1	2,500	Keglevits 4', Herzog 84'
33	28.04.1990	A	Austria Wien	0-0	9,000	
34	05.05.1990	H	VSE St. Pölten	6-3	3,800	Herzog 2' 43', Kienast R. 12', Pfeifenberger 24', Keglevits 25', Wurz 55'
35	08.05.1990	A	Sturm Graz	1-1	2,000	Kogler 25' (o.g.)
36	15.05.1990	H	Vienna	0-3	2,000	Pfeifenberger (red card) 77'

=== Cup ===
Rd	Date	Venue	Opponent	Res.	Att.	Goals and discipline
R2	19.09.1989	A	Tulln	2-0	1,700	Keglevits 63', Pfeifenberger 78'; Pecl (red card) 52'
R3	09.12.1989	A	FAC	4-0	1,500	Reisinger A. 24', Pfeifenberger 62', Fjørtoft 66' 70'
R16	03.04.1990	A	GAK	3-2 (a.e.t.)	3,000	Pfeifenberger 22' 43', Resch 118'
QF	17.04.1990	H	Leoben	2-0	800	Keglevits 26', Kranjcar 85' (pen.)
SF	24.04.1990	H	Spittal/Drau	3-1	3,000	Kranjcar 31' 53', Pfeifenberger 70'
F	12.05.1990	N	Austria Wien	1-3 (a.e.t.)	16,000	Fjørtoft 82'

=== UEFA Cup ===
Rd	Date	Venue	Opponent	Res.	Att.	Goals and discipline
R1-L1	12.09.1989	A	Aberdeen (Scotland)	1-2	18,000	Kranjcar 8'; Pecl (red card) 68'
R1-L2	26.09.1989	H	Aberdeen (Scotland)	1-0	19,038	Fjørtoft 18'
R2-L1	17.10.1989	A	Club Brugge (Belgium)	2-1	32,000	Keglevits 88', Pfeifenberger 90+1'
R2-L2	31.10.1989	H	Club Brugge (Belgium)	4-3	18,000	Fjørtoft 54', Keglevits 70' 89', Pfeifenberger 87'
R3-L1	22.11.1989	H	RFC Liège (Belgium)	1-0	18,000	Kranjcar 47'
R3-L2	06.12.1989	A	RFC Liège (Belgium)	1-3	18,000	Fjørtoft 78'
