= 1988–89 SK Rapid Wien season =

Rapid Wien
1988-89 season
- Coaches: Otto Baric, Vlatko Markovic
- Stadium: Gerhard-Hanappi-Stadion, Vienna, Austria
- Bundesliga: 4th
- Cup: Round of 16
- Austrian Supercup: Winner (3rd title)
- European Cup: 1st round
- Top goalscorer: League: Zlatko Kranjcar (17); All: Zlatko Kranjcar (21)
- Average home league attendance: 4,300

The 1988–89 SK Rapid Wien season was the 91st season in club history.

== Squad ==
=== Squad statistics ===
No.	Nat.	Name	Age	League		Cup		Supercup		European Cup		Total		Discipline	
No.	Nat.	Name	Age	Apps	Goals	Apps	Goals	Apps	Goals	Apps	Goals	Apps	Goals	Booked	Sent off (straight red)
Goalkeepers
1	(Austria)	Herbert Feurer	34	4+3		1						5+3			
1	(Austria)	Michael Konsel	26	32		2		1		2		37		2	
Defenders
4	(Austria)	Robert Pecl	22	25	2	3		1		2		31	2	12	2
5	(Austria)	Heribert Weber	33	30	1	3		1		2		36	1	13	1
13	(Austria)	Franz Blizenec	21	18+3	1	2+1		1				21+4	1	5	
15	(Austria)	Karl Brauneder	28	29		2+1		1		2		34+1		4	
18	(Austria)	Martin Puza	18	3+2								3+2		2	
Midfielders
2	(Austria)	Peter Schöttel	21	21+8		1		1		1+1		24+9		4	
3	(Austria)	Franz Weber	23	19+4	4	2+1				1		22+5	4	1	
6	(Austria)	Reinhard Kienast	28	34+1	7	2		1		2	1	39+1	8	5	
8	(Austria)	Andreas Herzog	19	34	8	3				2		39	8	6	
10	(Austria)	Gerald Willfurth	25	35	5	3	2	1		2		41	7	4	
12	(Socialist Federal Republic of Yugoslavia)	Mladen Munjakovic	26	26	1	3	1			2		31	2	4	2
14	(Austria)	Herbert Gager	18	3+8						1		4+8			
14	(Austria)	Roman Wallner	21	0+5	1							0+5	1		
16	(Soviet Union)	Sergey Shavlo	31	11+5	1	1		0+1		0+1		12+7	1		
Forwards
7	(Austria)	Paul Perstling	27	6+3	1	0+1		1		0+1		7+5	1	2	
7	(Iceland)	Guðmundur Torfason	26	6+1	1	0+1	1					6+2	2		
9	(Socialist Federal Republic of Yugoslavia)	Zlatko Kranjcar	31	33	17	1	3	1		2	1	37	21	3	1
11	(Socialist Federal Republic of Yugoslavia)	Zoran Stojadinovic	27	8+1	2	1	1	1	1	1		11+1	4		
12	(Uruguay)	Daniel Rodriguez	22	1+7	3							1+7	3		
13	(Austria)	Thomas Griessler	18	0+1								0+1			
17	(Austria)	Heimo Pfeifenberger	21	15+4	10	2	1	0+1				17+5	11	2	
19	(Austria)	Peter Wurz	20	3+7	1	1						4+7	1	2	
20	(Austria)	Andreas Huyer	19	0+3	1							0+3	1		

== Fixtures and results ==
Win Draw Loss

=== League ===
Rd	Date	Venue	Opponent	Res.	Att.	Goals and discipline
1	22.07.1988	A	VSE St. Pölten	0-1	7,000	
2	26.07.1988	H	Swarovski Tirol	1-0	9,000	Herzog 32'
3	29.07.1988	A	Sturm Graz	0-0	11,000	
4	05.08.1988	A	Austria Klagenfurt	4-1	10,000	Herzog 30', Willfurth 50', Stojadinovic 76', Shavlo 89'
5	13.08.1988	H	Admira	1-2	3,200	Weber F. 89'
6	20.08.1988	A	Vienna	2-2	5,000	Willfurth 55', Weber F. 83'
7	23.08.1988	H	LASK	3-1	1,500	Kranjcar 38', Stojadinovic 50' (pen.), Kienast R. 88'
8	27.08.1988	A	GAK	1-3	6,000	Herzog 24'
9	03.09.1988	H	Austria Wien	0-3	11,000	
10	10.09.1988	A	Steyr	2-2	8,000	Willfurth 37', Perstling 66'
11	17.09.1988	H	Wiener SC	1-1	7,000	Kranjcar 36'
12	23.09.1988	A	Wiener SC	3-0	4,000	Kranjcar 4' 87', Herzog 39'
13	30.09.1988	H	Steyr	1-0	1,700	Kranjcar 65' (pen.)
14	27.09.1988	A	Austria Wien	0-1	11,000	
15	12.10.1988	H	GAK	4-0	2,500	Kranjcar 39' 57', Willfurth 79', Kienast R. 89'
16	22.10.1988	A	LASK	2-1	2,000	Kranjcar 74', Weber F. 79'
17	13.09.1988	H	Vienna	0-1	3,000	Pecl (red card) 73'
18	05.11.1988	A	Admira	1-3	6,500	Herzog 73'
19	12.11.1988	H	Austria Klagenfurt	3-1	1,000	Kranjcar 9' (pen.) 34', Weber F. 32'
20	19.11.1988	H	Sturm Graz	1-0	1,000	Kranjcar 63'
21	26.11.1988	A	Swarovski Tirol	1-3	16,000	Wallner 84'; Munjakovic (red card) 76'
22	03.12.1988	H	VSE St. Pölten	4-0	3,000	Kranjcar 25' (pen.) 39' 55', Willfurth 53'
23	11.03.1989	A	Vienna	5-0	4,500	Munjakovic 2', Herzog 16', Pfeifenberger 47' 74', Kienast R. 50'
24	18.03.1989	H	VSE St. Pölten	4-0	3,000	Kranjcar 12' (pen.), Herzog 14', Pfeifenberger 60', Kienast R. 80'
25	28.03.1989	A	GAK	0-0	6,000	
26	31.03.1989	H	Austria Wien	0-0	16,000	
27	08.04.1989	A	Admira	2-3	4,000	Torfason 10', Pfeifenberger 83'
28	15.04.1989	H	Swarovski Tirol	2-3	5,500	Rodriguez 73', Kienast R. 74'
29	22.04.1989	A	Wiener SC	3-0	3,000	Pfeifenberger 3', Rodriguez 78' 87'
30	30.04.1989	H	Wiener SC	1-1	1,000	Kranjcar 9'
31	05.05.1989	H	Vienna	5-1	3,500	Kranjcar 1', Pfeifenberger 16' 51', Weber H. 37', Herzog 61'
32	12.05.1989	A	VSE St. Pölten	2-1	6,000	Kienast R. 44', Pfeifenberger 62'
33	26.05.1989	H	GAK	3-0	1,500	Pfeifenberger 6', Kienast R. 12', Pecl 53'
34	03.06.1989	A	Austria Wien	1-2	4,500	Pecl 47'; Weber H. (red card) 44', Munjakovic (red card) 88'
35	06.06.1989	H	Admira	1-2	3,000	Wurz 40'; Kranjcar (red card) 76'
36	09.06.1989	A	Swarovski Tirol	3-1	17,200	Blizenec 4', Pfeifenberger 80', Huyer A. 89'

=== Cup ===
Rd	Date	Venue	Opponent	Res.	Att.	Goals and discipline
R2	16.08.1988	A	Oberwart	3-0	2,500	Willfurth 11', Stojadinovic 75', Munjakovic 86'
R3	26.10.1988	A	Tulln	4-0	2,000	Kranjcar 10' 12' 37', Willfurth 43'
R16	04.04.1989	A	Admira	2-3 (a.e.t.)	6,000	Pfeifenberger 7', Torfason 68'; Pecl (red card) 118'

=== Supercup ===
Rd	Date	Venue	Opponent	Res.	Att.	Goals and discipline
F	16.07.1988	A	Kremser SC	1-1 (3-1 p)	7,000	Stojadinovic 77'

=== European Cup ===
Rd	Date	Venue	Opponent	Res.	Att.	Goals and discipline
R1-L1	07.09.1988	H	Galatasaray (Turkey)	2-1	14,500	Kranjcar 32', Kienast R. 51'
R1-L2	05.10.1988	A	Galatasaray (Turkey)	0-2	40,000	
