= 1991–92 SK Rapid Wien season =

Rapid Wien
1991–92 season
- President: Anton Benya
- Coach: Hans Krankl
- Stadium: Gerhard Hanappi Stadium, Vienna, Austria
- Bundesliga: 5th
- ÖFB-Cup: 4th round
- Top goalscorer: League: Jan Åge Fjørtoft (16); All: Jan Åge Fjørtoft (22)
- Highest home attendance: 19,500
- Lowest home attendance: 1,800

The 1991–92 SK Rapid Wien season was the 94th season in club history.

== Squad statistics ==
No.	Nat.	Name	Age	League		Cup		Total		Discipline	
No.	Nat.	Name	Age	Apps	Goals	Apps	Goals	Apps	Goals	Booked	Sent off (straight red)
Goalkeepers
1	(Austria)	Michael Konsel	29	27		2		29			
1	(Austria)	Roland Schrammel	22	9+1		1		10+1			
Defenders
2	(Austria)	Christian Salaba	20	8+1		1+1		9+2		2	
3	(Austria)	Franz Resch	22	21+1		1		22+1		4	
4	(Austria)	Robert Pecl	25	22+1	3	3	1	25+1	4	9	1
6	(Austria)	Reinhard Kienast	31	20+1	1	1		21+1	1	2	1
12	(Austria)	Martin Puza	21	13+1				13+1		5	
15	(Austria)	Michael Hatz	20	12+6		2		14+6		3	
16	(Austria)	Andreas Poiger	23	10+5		1	1	11+5	1	5	
17	(Austria)	Patrick Jovanovic	17	2				2		1	1
Midfielders
5	(Austria)	Peter Schöttel	24	20+5	1	2		22+5	1	7	
7	(Austria)	Franz Weber	26	33	2	2		35	2	4	
8	(Soviet Union) / (Belarus)	Alyaksandr Myatlitski	27	33+1	4	3	1	36+1	5	8	
10	(Austria)	Andreas Herzog	22	33	11	3	2	36	13	5	
12	(Austria)	Stefan Reiter	25	1+2		0+1		1+3			
13	(Austria)	Herbert Gager	21	27+5	4	2	1	29+5	5	6	
18	(Austria)	Daniel Madlener	26	14+2		1	1	15+2	1	4	
20	(Austria)	Horst Steiger	21	4+8		1+1	1	5+9	1	1	
	(Austria)	Robert Hnik	21			0+1	1	0+1	1		
	(Austria)	Reinhard Schulz	20	0+1				0+1			
Forwards
9	(Austria)	Heimo Pfeifenberger	24	31+3	9	2+1	1	33+4	10	7	
11	(Norway)	Jan Åge Fjørtoft	24	32+2	16	3	6	35+2	22	4	
14	(Austria)	Matthias Bleyer	21	9+4		0+1		9+5		2	
14	(Austria)	Thomas Griessler	21	3+3	2			3+3	2		
17	(Argentina)	Adrián Czornomaz	23	1+2		1		2+2			
18	(Austria)	Joachim Moitzi	22	0+3				0+3			
19	(Austria)	Gerhard Rodax	25	11+1	4	1		12+1	4	1	

== Fixtures and results ==
Win Draw Loss

=== Bundesliga ===
Rd	Date	Venue	Opponent	Res.	Att.	Goals and discipline
1	24.07.1991	H	Steyr	2-0	5,000	Herzog 12', Fjørtoft 39'
2	27.07.1991	A	Sturm Graz	1-0	7,000	Fjørtoft 40'
3	31.07.1991	H	Austria Wien	1-1	19,500	Pecl 47'
4	03.08.1991	A	Leoben	5-2	4,000	Fjørtoft 2' 4' 45', Kienast R. 6', Weber F. 39'
5	10.08.1991	H	VSE St. Pölten	4-1	7,000	Gager 40', Fjørtoft 43' 81', Pfeifenberger 64'
6	17.08.1991	A	Swarovski Tirol	0-0	15,500	
7	24.08.1991	H	VÖEST Linz	0-1	7,000	
8	27.08.1991	A	Austria Salzburg	2-3	17,000	Herzog 57' (pen.) 77'; Jovanovic P. (red card) 47'
9	31.08.1991	A	Admira	0-2	5,000	
10	07.09.1991	H	Kremser SC	0-1	2,500	
11	10.09.1991	A	Vienna	4-0	4,500	Herzog 5', Fjørtoft 26' 42', Weber F. 37'
12	14.09.1991	H	Vienna	3-0	3,800	Griessler 23', Pecl 74', Pfeifenberger 88'
13	21.09.1991	A	Steyr	1-1	6,000	Griessler 20'
14	28.09.1991	H	Sturm Graz	2-2	3,500	Herzog 9', Gager 79'
15	05.10.1991	A	Austria Wien	1-5	13,000	Pfeifenberger 16'; Kienast R. (red card) 55'
16	19.10.1991	H	Leoben	3-0	1,800	Gager 13', Herzog 54' (pen.), Pfeifenberger 87'
17	26.10.1991	A	VSE St. Pölten	2-2	4,000	Herzog 41', Fjørtoft 57'
18	02.11.1991	H	Swarovski Tirol	2-1	7,500	Fjørtoft 43' 49'
19	09.11.1991	A	VÖEST Linz	1-1	9,000	Pfeifenberger 37'
20	16.11.1991	H	Austria Salzburg	1-0	7,500	Pfeifenberger 69'
21	23.11.1991	H	Admira	1-1	5,000	Myatlitski 64'
22	30.11.1991	A	Kremser SC	1-0	1,500	Herzog 83'
23	07.03.1992	A	VÖEST Linz	0-1	15,000	
24	14.03.1992	H	VSE St. Pölten	1-0	5,400	Pecl 43'
25	21.03.1992	A	Austria Salzburg	2-0	14,000	Myatlitski 66' 87'
26	04.04.1992	H	Austria Wien	1-0	18,500	Schöttel 88'
27	07.04.1992	A	Steyr	0-1	7,000	
28	11.04.1992	H	Swarovski Tirol	4-0	10,000	Herzog 21', Fjørtoft 42' 84', Gager 48' (pen.)
29	25.04.1992	A	Admira	1-3	7,000	Rodax 25'
30	22.04.1992	H	Admira	0-0	5,000	
31	02.05.1992	H	VÖEST Linz	4-1	4,500	Herzog 12', Pfeifenberger 16', Fjørtoft 25', Werner 52' (o.g.)
32	09.05.1992	A	VSE St. Pölten	2-3	3,500	Rodax 8' (pen.), Fjørtoft 90'
33	13.05.1992	H	Austria Salzburg	1-1	10,500	Myatlitski 11'
34	23.05.1992	A	Austria Wien	1-2	16,000	Pfeifenberger 8'; Pecl (red card) 76'
35	30.05.1992	H	Steyr	4-3	2,500	Pfeifenberger 7', Rodax 15' 85', Herzog 22'
36	03.06.1992	A	Swarovski Tirol	0-1	9,000	

=== Cup ===
Rd	Date	Venue	Opponent	Res.	Att.	Goals and discipline
R2	14.08.1991	A	Austria XIII	6-0	1,700	Fjørtoft 10' 72' 89', Pfeifenberger 56', Herzog 84', Poiger 88'
R3	12.10.1991	A	Rohrbach	10-0	6,500	Pecl 3', Herzog 7', Madlener 9', Fjørtoft 12' 19' 68', Hnik 48', Myatlitski 53', Steiger 61', Gager 78'
R16	29.03.1992	A	FavAC	0-2	4,400	
