= 1990–91 SK Rapid Wien season =

Rapid Wien
1990–91 season
- President: Anton Benya
- Coach: Hans Krankl
- Stadium: Gerhard Hanappi Stadium, Vienna, Austria
- Bundesliga: 4th
- ÖFB-Cup: Runner-up
- UEFA Cup: 1st round
- Top goalscorer: League: Jan Åge Fjørtoft (17); All: Jan Åge Fjørtoft (21)
- Highest home attendance: 16,000
- Lowest home attendance: 1,500

The 1990–91 SK Rapid Wien season was the 93rd season in club history.

== Squad statistics ==
No.	Nat.	Name	Age	League		Cup		UEFA Cup		Total		Discipline	
No.	Nat.	Name	Age	Apps	Goals	Apps	Goals	Apps	Goals	Apps	Goals	Booked	Sent off (straight red)
Goalkeepers
1	(Austria)	Michael Konsel	28	36		6		2		44		1	
Defenders
3	(Austria)	Andreas Poiger	22	31+2	2	4+2		2		37+4	2	8	1
4	(Austria)	Robert Pecl	24	19	3	2		2		23	3	8	2
6	(Austria)	Reinhard Kienast	30	30	5	3	1	2		35	6	7	
14	(Austria)	Franz Blizenec	23	7						7			
15	(Austria)	Karl Brauneder	30	2+8		1				3+8			
19	(Austria)	Michael Hatz	19	11		4				15		5	
	(Austria)	Patrick Jovanovic	16	1						1			
Midfielders
2	(Austria)	Helmut Hauptmann	25	25+1		6	2	1+1		32+2	2	5	
5	(Austria)	Peter Schöttel	23	33		5		2		40		13	1
8	(Argentina)	Hugo Maradona	21	1+2						1+2			
10	(Austria)	Andreas Herzog	21	28+2	6	5+1	2	2		35+3	8	11	2
12	(Austria)	Stefan Reiter	24	9+1		2+1	1			11+2	1	7	
13	(Austria)	Franz Resch	21	14+2		4				18+2		4	
14	(Croatia)	Zlatko Kranjcar	33	2+3		1				3+3			
16	(Austria)	Andreas Reisinger	26	26+3	3	2+2		2		30+5	3	8	1
17	(Austria)	Manfred Kern	26	14+10	3	1				15+10	3	1	
18	(Austria)	Franz Weber	25	7+2	1	1	2	1+1	1	9+3	4	1	1
20	(Austria)	Horst Steiger	20	9	1	3		1		13	1	1	
	(Austria)	Edin Emrovic	16	1		0+1				1+1			
	(Austria)	Michael Strasser	16	0+1						0+1			
Forwards
7	(Austria)	Christian Keglevits	29	22+5	10	3+1		1	1	26+6	11	4	
9	(Austria)	Heimo Pfeifenberger	23	25+4	10	4+1	4	2	1	31+5	15	4	1
11	(Norway)	Jan Åge Fjørtoft	23	28+5	17	5	4	2		35+5	21	3	
15	(Costa Rica)	Hernán Medford	22	12	4	4	3			16	7	1	1
18	(Austria)	Joachim Moitzi	21	1+7	1	0+1				1+8	1	1	
19	(Austria)	Peter Wurz	22	2+3		0+1	1	0+2		2+6	1		
	(Austria)	Helmuth Aberle	21	0+2						0+2			

== Fixtures and results ==
Win Draw Loss

=== League ===
Rd	Date	Venue	Opponent	Res.	Att.	Goals and discipline
1	28.07.1990	A	Steyr	2-1	5,500	Reisinger A. 53', Kienast R. 65'; Pecl (red card) 83'
2	01.08.1990	H	Vienna	3-1	4,000	Kienast R. 27', Keglevits 61', Fjørtoft 63'
3	04.08.1990	A	Leoben	0-0	5,000	
4	07.08.1990	A	Sturm Graz	1-1	7,000	Keglevits 53'
5	11.08.1990	H	VSE St. Pölten	1-1	4,500	Reisinger A. 81'
6	18.08.1990	A	Swarovski Tirol	2-3	14,000	Kienast R. 47', Fjørtoft 59'
7	25.08.1990	H	Austria Salzburg	2-4	4,500	Fjørtoft 77', Pfeifenberger 84'
8	28.08.1990	H	Austria Wien	2-0	15,500	Fjørtoft 10', Pecl 40'
9	01.09.1990	H	Admira	2-0	3,000	Pecl 17', Pfeifenberger 70'
10	08.09.1990	A	Wiener SC	7-1	5,000	Herzog 4' 10', Poiger 20', Pecl 67', Pfeifenberger 75' 81', Fjørtoft 88'
11	14.09.1990	H	Kremser SC	4-1	3,000	Keglevits 30' 59', Fjørtoft 79', Pfeifenberger 86' (pen.)
12	22.09.1990	A	Kremser SC	3-0	3,500	Herzog 26', Fjørtoft 27', Pfeifenberger 89'
13	28.09.1990	H	Sturm Graz	3-1	7,500	Fjørtoft 47' 68', Kern 57'
14	06.10.1990	A	Austria Wien	3-0	15,000	Pfeifenberger 9', Fjørtoft 36' 82'
15	09.10.1990	H	Leoben	0-2	2,500	
16	12.10.1990	H	Steyr	2-0	4,000	Herzog 48', Kienast R. 56'
17	21.10.1990	A	Vienna	2-0	6,000	Fjørtoft 34', Pfeifenberger 53'
18	03.11.1990	A	VSE St. Pölten	0-1	4,000	
19	10.11.1990	H	Swarovski Tirol	1-2	12,000	Weber F. 16'; Weber F. (red card) 90'
20	17.11.1990	A	Austria Salzburg	0-2	15,000	Herzog (red card) 75'
21	24.11.1990	A	Admira	2-0	5,000	Keglevits 61' (pen.), Kern 81'
22	01.12.1990	H	Wiener SC	5-0	2,000	Kern 3', Steiger 9', Fjørtoft 39' 64', Keglevits 50'
23	09.03.1991	H	Sturm Graz	0-1	5,000	
24	16.03.1991	A	Austria Salzburg	0-0	16,000	
25	23.03.1991	H	Austria Wien	1-2	16,000	Medford 66'
26	30.03.1991	A	Swarovski Tirol	0-2	15,000	Poiger (red card) 31'
27	06.04.1991	H	Leoben	4-0	3,500	Medford 36' 43', Moitzi 84', Fjørtoft 90'
28	13.04.1991	A	Steyr	3-0	8,000	Krinner 35' (o.g.), Fjørtoft 57', Reisinger A. 60' (pen.)
29	19.04.1991	H	Admira	1-0	2,200	Fjørtoft 46'
30	27.04.1991	A	Admira	2-2	2,300	Kienast R. 66', Keglevits 86'; Reisinger A. (red card) 78'
31	04.05.1991	A	Sturm Graz	1-3	5,000	Medford 45'
32	11.05.1991	H	Austria Salzburg	4-2	3,500	Pfeifenberger 2', Keglevits 40', Poiger 66', Herzog 68'
33	02.06.1991	A	Austria Wien	1-2	16,000	Herzog 61'
34	25.05.1991	H	Swarovski Tirol	3-2	7,000	Keglevits 3' 55', Pfeifenberger 77'
35	08.06.1991	A	Leoben	0-2	3,000	Schöttel (red card) 72'
36	12.06.1991	H	Steyr	0-2	15,000	

=== Cup ===
Rd	Date	Venue	Opponent	Res.	Att.	Goals and discipline
R2	15.08.1990	A	Sigleß	5-1	2,500	Fjørtoft 8', Weber F. 43' 88', Hauptmann 47', Pfeifenberger 72'
R3	05.09.1990	A	Eisenstadt	5-0	3,600	Fjørtoft 12', Herzog 20' (pen.), Kienast R. 28', Wurz 77', Pfeifenberger 90'
R16	09.04.1991	A	Deutschlandsberg	3-1	3,000	Medford 23' 76', Fjørtoft 50'; Herzog (red card) 23'
QF	23.04.1991	A	FC Salzburg	5-1	2,000	Pfeifenberger 21' 82', Fjørtoft 39', Hauptmann 77', Medford 88'
SF	08.05.1991	A	LUV Graz	1-0	5,500	Herzog 46'
F	31.05.1991	N	Stockerau	1-2	12,000	Reiter S. 8'; Medford (red card) 89'

=== UEFA Cup ===
Rd	Date	Venue	Opponent	Res.	Att.	Goals and discipline
R1-L1	18.09.1990	H	Inter Milan (Italy)	2-1	15,000	Pfeifenberger 55', Keglevits 71'
R1-L2	02.10.1990	A	Inter Milan (Italy)	1-3 (a.e.t.)	35,000	Weber F. 90'; Pecl (red card) 18', Pfeifenberger (red card) 112'
