= 1987–88 SK Rapid Wien season =

Rapid Wien
1987-88 season
- Coach: Otto Baric
- Stadium: Gerhard-Hanappi-Stadion, Vienna, Austria
- Bundesliga: Champions (29th title)
- Cup: Round of 16
- Austrian Supercup: Winner (2nd title)
- European Cup: Round of 16
- Top goalscorer: League: Zoran Stojadinovic (27); All: Zoran Stojadinovic (33)
- Average home league attendance: 5,800

The 1987–88 SK Rapid Wien season was the 90th season in club history.

== Squad ==
=== Squad statistics ===
No.	Nat.	Name	Age	League		Cup		Supercup		European Cup		Total		Discipline	
No.	Nat.	Name	Age	Apps	Goals	Apps	Goals	Apps	Goals	Apps	Goals	Apps	Goals	Booked	Sent off (straight red)
Goalkeepers
1	(Austria)	Herbert Feurer	33	2+1		1		0+1				3+2			
1	(Austria)	Michael Konsel	25	34		2		1		4		41		1	
Defenders
2	(Austria)	Peter Schöttel	20	22+2		2				1		25+2		2	
3	(Austria)	Kurt Garger	26	33+1	1	2		1	1	4		40+1	2	4	
4	(Austria)	Robert Pecl	21	31	1	0+1		1		3		35+1	1	9	
5	(Austria)	Heribert Weber	32	28	7	3		1		4	1	36	8	6	1
13	(Austria)	Franz Blizenec	20	2+2		1						3+2			
Midfielders
2	(Austria)	Leo Lainer	26	19		1		0+1		4		24+1		5	
6	(Austria)	Reinhard Kienast	27	26+3	3	2		1		4		33+3	3	3	1
8	(Austria)	Peter Hristic	25	18+7	4	2+1		1	1	1		22+8	5	1	
9	(Socialist Federal Republic of Yugoslavia)	Zlatko Kranjcar	30	31	17	2		1		4	3	38	20	4	
10	(Austria)	Gerald Willfurth	24	35	9	3	1	1		3	1	42	11	6	1
12	(Austria)	Franz Weber	22	1+13	2	0+1				0+3		1+17	2	1	
14	(Austria)	Rudolf Weinhofer	25	12+7		2+1		1				15+8		4	
15	(Austria)	Karl Brauneder	27	33+1	1	1+2	1	1		4		39+3	2	6	
16	(Soviet Union)	Sergey Shavlo	30	3+3	1	2				1+2		6+5	1		
18	(Austria)	Andreas Herzog	18	1+4								1+4			
Forwards
7	(Austria)	Andreas Heraf	19	18+13	2	3	1	1		1+2		23+15	3	1	
11	(Socialist Federal Republic of Yugoslavia)	Zoran Stojadinovic	26	30+2	27	3	3	0+1		4	3	37+3	33		
17	(Socialist Federal Republic of Yugoslavia)	Sulejman Halilovic	31	13	2	1				2+1		16+1	2	2	1
19	(Austria)	Peter Wurz	19	4+2	2							4+2	2		

== Fixtures and results ==
Win Draw Loss

=== League ===
Rd	Date	Venue	Opponent	Res.	Att.	Goals and discipline
1	21.07.1987	H	VÖEST Linz	2-1	4,500	Kienast R. 24', Kranjcar 65'
2	24.07.1987	A	Wiener SC	3-1	5,000	Weber H. 14', Kranjcar 63', Kienast R. 77'
3	31.07.1987	H	Admira	3-2	4,000	Garger 2', Kranjcar 53' (pen.) 61'
4	05.08.1987	A	VfB Mödling	3-0	10,000	Stojadinovic 49', Willfurth 56', Hristic 75'
5	07.08.1987	H	Sturm Graz	2-0	5,200	Willfurth 23', Weber F. 90'
6	14.08.1987	H	LASK	3-1	5,000	Stojadinovic 24' 48', Kranjcar 33' (pen.)
7	22.08.1987	A	Vienna	2-1	6,500	Willfurth 29', Hristic 53'
8	29.08.1987	H	GAK	4-0	13,500	Halilovic 16', Willfurth 43', Kranjcar 78' (pen.) 90'
9	01.09.1987	A	Swarovski Tirol	3-3	16,000	Stojadinovic 44' 75', Weber H. 57'
10	04.09.1987	H	Austria Klagenfurt	3-0	3,500	Weber H. 7', Stojadinovic 21', Hristic 78'
11	11.09.1987	A	Austria Wien	2-1	22,000	Stojadinovic 67', Willfurth 82'
12	18.09.1987	A	VÖEST Linz	1-1	6,700	Pecl 53'
13	26.09.1987	H	Wiener SC	3-3	14,544	Willfurth 31', Stojadinovic 43', Weber F. 67'
14	03.10.1987	A	Admira	2-1	6,500	Weber H. 10', Stojadinovic 88'; Kienast R. (red card) 21'
15	10.10.1987	H	VfB Mödling	5-1	4,596	Stojadinovic 11' 15' 34' (pen.), Gramann 16' (o.g.), Weber H. 72'
16	17.10.1987	A	Sturm Graz	2-0	7,000	Stojadinovic 53', Heraf 61'
17	24.10.1987	A	LASK	3-1	2,700	Stojadinovic 3' 24', Weber H. 13'
18	30.10.1987	H	Vienna	3-1	3,832	Kranjcar 33', Willfurth 60', Heraf 67'
19	07.11.1987	A	GAK	1-1	10,000	Weber H. 18'
20	14.11.1987	H	Swarovski Tirol	0-0	5,449	
21	21.11.1987	A	Austria Klagenfurt	1-1	3,000	Stojadinovic 42'
22	28.11.1987	H	Austria Wien	1-2	7,518	Stojadinovic 90+1'
23	23.03.1988	A	Wiener SC	0-0	6,000	
24	19.03.1988	H	Sturm Graz	1-1	3,000	Willfurth 41'
25	26.03.1988	A	Swarovski Tirol	0-0	10,000	
26	02.04.1988	A	Austria Wien	2-4	10,500	Stojadinovic 46', Kranjcar 57'
27	09.04.1988	A	GAK	0-0	7,000	Halilovic (red card) 25'
28	15.04.1988	H	Admira	2-1	4,300	Stojadinovic 2' (pen.), Shavlo 30'
29	23.04.1988	A	Vienna	3-1	7,000	Kranjcar 25' 68', Kienast R. 84'
30	29.04.1988	H	Vienna	3-1	4,500	Stojadinovic 3' (pen.), Kranjcar 77' 80'
31	06.05.1988	H	Wiener SC	3-0	3,000	Halilovic 43', Kranjcar 45' 58'
32	14.05.1988	A	Sturm Graz	1-2	7,000	Stojadinovic 48' (pen.)
33	20.05.1988	H	Swarovski Tirol	4-2	5,500	Willfurth 4', Wurz 15', Stojadinovic 28', Brauneder 85'
34	27.05.1988	H	Austria Wien	2-4	8,200	Stojadinovic 17' (pen.), Obermayer 61' (o.g.); Weber H. (red card) 66'
35	03.06.1988	A	Admira	2-1	3,000	Kranjcar 31', Hristic 60'
36	07.06.1988	H	GAK	6-1	3,800	Stojadinovic 8' 11' 53' 66', Kranjcar 51', Wurz 86'

=== Cup ===
Rd	Date	Venue	Opponent	Res.	Att.	Goals and discipline
R2	11.08.1987	A	Bruck/Leitha	4-0	2,000	Heraf 15', Stojadinovic 41' 51' 75'
R3	29.03.1988	A	Wiener Neustadt	1-0	1,500	Willfurth 44'
R16	19.04.1988	H	Vienna	1-2 (a.e.t.)	5,000	Brauneder 79'; Willfurth (red card) 79'

=== Supercup ===
Rd	Date	Venue	Opponent	Res.	Att.	Goals and discipline
F	18.07.1987	H	Swarovski Tirol	2-1	6,000	Hristic 5', Garger 84'

=== European Cup ===
Rd	Date	Venue	Opponent	Res.	Att.	Goals and discipline
R1-L1	16.09.1987	H	Hamrun Spartans (Malta)	6-0	6,200	Kranjcar 8' (pen.) 43', Stojadinovic 29' 81' 88', Willfurth 76'
R1-L2	30.09.1987	A	Hamrun Spartans (Malta)	1-0	500	Weber H. 60'
R2-L1	21.10.1987	H	PSV (Netherlands)	1-2	20,000	Kranjcar 47' (pen.)
R2-L2	04.11.1987	A	PSV (Netherlands)	0-2	29,000	
