= 1992–93 SK Rapid Wien season =

Rapid Wien
1992–93 season
- President: Anton Benya
- Coach: August Starek
- Stadium: Gerhard Hanappi Stadium, Vienna, Austria
- Bundesliga: 4th
- ÖFB-Cup: Runner-up
- UEFA Cup: 1st round
- Top goalscorer: League: Jan Åge Fjørtoft (13); All: Jan Åge Fjørtoft (19)
- Highest home attendance: 14,500
- Lowest home attendance: 2,000

The 1992–93 SK Rapid Wien season is the 95th season in club history.

== Squad statistics ==
No.	Nat.	Name	Age	League		Cup		UEFA Cup		Total		Discipline	
No.	Nat.	Name	Age	Apps	Goals	Apps	Goals	Apps	Goals	Apps	Goals	Booked	Sent off (straight red)
Goalkeepers
1	(Austria)	Michael Konsel	30	36		6		2		44		1	
Defenders
4	(Austria)	Robert Pecl	26	23+1	2	4				27+1	2	6	1
5	(Austria)	Peter Schöttel	25	24+4	1	2		2		28+4	1	9	1
6	(Austria)	Franz Blizenec	25	20+5	2	5+1	1	2		27+6	3	8	
12	(Austria)	Patrick Jovanovic	18	22+1		5		0+1		27+2		4	
15	(Austria)	Michael Hatz	21	21+2	1	4				25+2	1	1	1
16	(Austria)	Andreas Poiger	24	10+3		2+2		2		14+5			
Midfielders
2	(Austria)	Martin Puza	22	21+4		2		2		25+4		7	1
3	(Austria)	Franz Resch	23	12+2		1		2		15+2		3	
7	(Austria)	Franz Weber	27	24+2	1	4		2		30+2	1	5	
8	(Belarus)	Alyaksandr Myatlitski	28	24	6	3	2	1		28	8	10	2
10	(Austria)	Dietmar Kühbauer	21	32+1	3	5				37+1	3	15	1
13	(Austria)	Herbert Gager	22	2+1						2+1		1	
14	(Austria)	Karl Brauneder	32	21	1	4				25	1	3	
17	(Austria)	Roman Stary	18	0+2		0+2	1			0+4	1		
18	(Tajikistan)	Sergei Mandreko	20	20+2	3	4	1	2	1	26+2	5	3	
20	(Austria)	Horst Steiger	22	9+12	1	3+2				12+14	1		
	(Austria)	Robert Nemeth	19	0+1						0+1			
Forwards
9	(Czechoslovakia) / (Slovakia)	Stanislav Griga	30	16+7	9	3+1	1	1		20+8	10		
11	(Norway)	Jan Åge Fjørtoft	25	27+1	13	4	4	2	2	33+1	19	4	
14	(Austria)	Thomas Griessler	22	1+2		0+2				1+4			
19	(Austria)	Gerhard Rodax	26	30+1	8	4		2		36+1	8		
	(Austria)	Joachim Kolowrat	18	1+8		1	1			2+8	1		

== Fixtures and results ==
Win Draw Loss

=== Bundesliga ===
Rd	Date	Venue	Opponent	Res.	Att.	Goals and discipline
1	24.07.1992	H	Wiener SC	1-2	6,000	Griga 67'
2	29.07.1992	A	Admira	3-4	5,500	Myatlitski 7', Rodax 32', Fjørtoft 41'; Myatlitski (yellow card) 63' (red card) , Hatz (red card) 88'
3	01.08.1992	H	Austria Wien	0-0	8,500	
4	05.08.1992	A	Sturm Graz	0-2	7,000	
5	08.08.1992	H	VÖEST Linz	2-1	2,000	Werner 21' (o.g.), Blizenec 55'
6	12.08.1992	A	Wacker Innsbruck	0-0	7,000	
7	15.08.1992	H	VSE St. Pölten	4-1	3,500	Griga 11' 75', Mandreko 26', Fjørtoft 35'
8	22.08.1992	A	VfB Mödling	1-1	3,000	Mandreko 12'
9	29.08.1992	A	Austria Salzburg	2-2	12,000	Mandreko 69', Griga 82'
10	05.09.1992	H	LASK	5-1	2,500	Weber F. 12', Griga 41', Myatlitski 44', Kühbauer 48', Rodax 53'
11	08.09.1992	A	Steyr	0-0	4,000	Schöttel (red card) 74'
12	19.09.1992	H	Steyr	0-1	4,500	
13	26.09.1992	A	Wiener SC	1-3	7,000	Griga 60'
14	03.10.1992	H	Admira	2-1	3,500	Fjørtoft 56', Blizenec 85'
15	07.10.1992	A	Austria Wien	2-1	16,000	Myatlitski 33', Fjørtoft 75'
16	17.10.1992	H	Sturm Graz	1-0	2,500	Fjørtoft 33'
17	24.10.1992	A	VÖEST Linz	1-1	3,000	Rodax 31'; Myatlitski (red card) 39'
18	31.10.1992	H	Wacker Innsbruck	4-2	6,500	Fjørtoft 11' 44' 55', Steiger 88'
19	07.11.1992	A	VSE St. Pölten	1-1	5,000	Brauneder 24'
20	14.11.1992	H	VfB Mödling	1-0	6,500	Hatz 90+2'
21	21.11.1992	H	Austria Salzburg	2-2	7,000	Fjørtoft 4', Reinmayr 26' (o.g.)
22	28.11.1992	A	LASK	1-0	1,000	Griga 73'
23	16.03.1993	H	VSE St. Pölten	2-2	3,300	Fjørtoft 77' 80'
24	13.03.1993	A	Admira	2-1	12,000	Fjørtoft 71', Pecl 73'
25	20.03.1993	A	Austria Salzburg	0-1	13,000	Puza (red card) 77'
26	03.04.1993	H	Steyr	3-1	3,600	Fjørtoft 17', Myatlitski 59' (pen.), Rodax 66'
27	07.04.1993	A	Wiener SC	2-0	5,250	Schöttel 34', Rodax 55'
28	17.04.1993	H	Austria Wien	1-5	14,500	Griga 90+1'
29	24.04.1993	A	Wacker Innsbruck	0-2	6,000	
30	28.04.1993	H	Wacker Innsbruck	2-3	4,500	Pecl 15', Griga 33'
31	08.05.1993	A	VSE St. Pölten	0-5	2,200	Pecl (red card) 62'
32	22.05.1993	H	Admira	4-0	2,200	Rodax 35' 70' 75', Kühbauer 83'
33	29.05.1993	H	Austria Salzburg	1-0	6,500	Kühbauer 87'
34	05.06.1993	A	Steyr	1-0	3,000	Myatlitski 45'
35	09.06.1993	H	Wiener SC	1-1	2,500	Myatlitski 50'
36	12.06.1993	A	Austria Wien	0-4	27,000	Kühbauer (red card) 45'

=== Cup ===
Rd	Date	Venue	Opponent	Res.	Att.	Goals and discipline
R2	11.09.1992	A	Eisenstadt	1-0	4,000	Blizenec 86'
R3	10.04.1993	A	Altheim	3-0	2,000	Kolowrat 29', Myatlitski 30' 80' (pen.)
R16	01.05.1993	A	Vienna	4-2 (a.e.t.)	3,000	Vidreis 50' (o.g.), Stary 72', Fjørtoft 93', Griga 115'
QF	25.05.1993	A	Flavia Solva	2-0	6,000	Fjørtoft 49' 65'
SF	02.06.1993	H	FavAC	2-1	3,500	Siegl 21' (o.g.), Mandreko 67'
F	19.06.1993	N	Wacker Innsbruck	1-3	12,000	Fjørtoft 78'

=== UEFA Cup ===
Rd	Date	Venue	Opponent	Res.	Att.	Goals and discipline
R1-L1	16.09.1992	A	Dynamo Kyiv (Ukraine)	0-1	18,000	
R1-L2	30.09.1992	H	Dynamo Kyiv (Ukraine)	3-2	16,000	Mandreko 8', Fjørtoft 15' 38'
