= 1985–86 SK Rapid Wien season =

Rapid Wien
1985–86 season
- Coach: Vlatko Markovic
- Stadium: Gerhard-Hanappi-Stadion, Vienna, Austria
- Bundesliga: 2nd
- Cup: Runners-up
- Cup Winners' Cup: Quarter-finals
- Top goalscorer: League: Zlatko Kranjcar (23); All: Zlatko Kranjcar (26)
- Average home league attendance: 6,100

The 1985–86 SK Rapid Wien season was the 88th season in club history.

== Squad ==
=== Squad statistics ===
No.	Nat.	Name	Age	League		Cup		CW Cup		Total		Discipline	
No.	Nat.	Name	Age	Apps	Goals	Apps	Goals	Apps	Goals	Apps	Goals	Booked	Sent off (straight red)
Goalkeepers
1	(Austria)	Herbert Feurer	31	11		4		0+1		15+1			
1	(Austria)	Michael Konsel	23	25		1+1		6		32+1			
Defenders
2	(Austria)	Leo Lainer	24	33	7	4	1	5		42	8	9	
3	(Austria)	Kurt Garger	24	21+2		4		5+1		30+3		3	
4	(Austria)	Johann Pregesbauer	27	10+2	1	0+1		1+1		11+4	1		
5	(Austria)	Heribert Weber	30	32	3	5	1	5		42	4	7	
15	(Austria)	Karl Brauneder	25	35	3	3		6		44	3	5	
16	(Austria)	Leopold Rotter	20	2+1				1+1		3+2			
Midfielders
6	(Austria)	Reinhard Kienast	25	28	4	5	4	4	1	37	9	2	
7	(Socialist Federal Republic of Yugoslavia)	Zlatko Kranjcar	28	34	23	5	2	6	1	45	26	10	
10	(Socialist Federal Republic of Yugoslavia)	Petar Brucic	32	33	3	3		5		41	3	7	1
12	(Austria)	Franz Weber	20	2+10	2	1+2		1+2		4+14	2	1	
13	(Austria)	Peter Hristic	23	5+14	3	1+2		0+2		6+18	3	1	
14	(Austria)	Rudolf Weinhofer	23	29+2	3	4		5	1	38+2	4	1	
18	(Austria)	Gerald Willfurth	22	25+4	6	5	2	4+1	1	34+5	9		
19	(Austria)	Andreas Heraf	17	1+4		0+1				1+5			
Forwards
8	(Socialist Federal Republic of Yugoslavia)	Sulejman Halilovic	29	32+1	10	4	4	6	4	42+1	18	6	
9	(Austria)	Hans Krankl	32	17	18	1	1	3	1	21	20	1	1
11	(Austria)	Peter Pacult	25	21+10	14	3+1	3	2+2	3	26+13	20	1	
17	(Austria)	Hermann Stadler	24	0+6		2		1		3+6			
	(Austria)	Bernhard Brunner	18	0+1				0+1		0+2			

== Fixtures and results ==
Win Draw Loss

=== League ===
Rd	Date	Venue	Opponent	Res.	Att.	Goals and discipline
1	09.08.1985	H	Admira	3-1	4,500	Krankl 17' 77', Kranjcar 57'
2	13.08.1985	H	Wacker Innsbruck	6-0	14,500	Krankl 21' 69', Brauneder 32', Lainer 53', Kranjcar 63', Pacult 81'
3	16.08.1985	A	Austria Klagenfurt	2-2	10,000	Krankl 36' 80' (pen.)
4	10.09.1985	H	LASK	5-0	6,000	Kranjcar 31', Willfurth 36', Brucic 40', Krankl 77', Lainer 85'
5	24.08.1985	A	Sturm Graz	2-2	10,000	Kranjcar 70', Weber F. 90'
6	27.08.1985	H	Eisenstadt	6-0	9,500	Bronkhorst 6' (o.g.), Krankl 15' (pen.) 21' 76' 80', Kranjcar 63'
7	31.08.1985	A	Austria Wien	0-0	8,500	
8	06.09.1985	H	Leoben	3-0	5,000	Willfurth 11', Krankl 68' (pen.), Lainer 86'
9	13.09.1985	A	SAK 1914	3-2	9,000	Krankl 78' (pen.), Kranjcar 81' 88'
10	21.09.1985	H	VÖEST Linz	7-0	2,500	Willfurth 7', Kranjcar 14' 44', Krankl 28' 89' (pen.), Brucic 42', Kienast R. 84'
11	27.09.1985	A	GAK	10-0	7,000	Krankl 1', Halilovic 11', Kranjcar 19' 26' 64' 75', Brucic 47', Pacult 82' 89', Weber F. 87'
12	05.10.1985	A	Admira	2-0	9,000	Halilovic 20', Krankl 23'
13	11.10.1985	A	Wacker Innsbruck	2-1	10,000	Kranjcar 18', Krankl 26' (pen.)
14	18.10.1985	H	Austria Klagenfurt	4-0	4,500	Willfurth 31' 64', Lainer 82' 86'
15	26.10.1985	A	LASK	0-0	11,500	
16	02.11.1985	H	Sturm Graz	3-0	4,500	Kranjcar 74', Halilovic 76', Pacult 81'
17	09.11.1985	A	Eisenstadt	0-0	5,000	
18	16.11.1985	H	Austria Wien	1-5	15,500	Pregesbauer 4'; Krankl (red card) 79'
19	23.11.1985	A	Leoben	3-2	3,000	Weinhofer 11', Halilovic 16', Brauneder 79'
20	30.11.1985	H	SAK 1914	4-0	1,500	Kranjcar 13' (pen.) 20' 75', Pacult 86'
21	07.12.1985	A	VÖEST Linz	4-0	3,500	Weinhofer 42', Pacult 65', Kienast R. 78', Lainer 88'
22	14.12.1985	H	GAK	3-0	2,400	Lainer 9', Halilovic 66', Hristic 71'
23	01.03.1986	H	Austria Klagenfurt	2-2	2,800	Pacult 8' 19'
24	08.03.1986	A	GAK	1-0	2,500	Kranjcar 2'
25	15.03.1986	A	Admira	4-0	4,800	Weber H. 33', Pacult 55' 64', Kienast R. 83'
26	22.03.1986	H	LASK	0-3	2,600	
27	29.03.1986	A	Sturm Graz	0-0	8,000	
28	05.04.1986	H	Austria Wien	2-0	14,500	Halilovic 11', Kranjcar 90+1'
29	12.04.1986	A	Wacker Innsbruck	0-2	10,000	Brucic (red card) 57'
30	18.04.1986	A	Austria Klagenfurt	1-1	4,500	Halilovic 80'
31	25.04.1986	H	GAK	3-1	2,200	Halilovic 4', Weinhofer 10', Pacult 53'
32	02.05.1986	H	Admira	5-3	3,000	Brauneder 18', Pacult 35' 55', Kranjcar 40', Weber H. 46'
33	09.05.1986	A	LASK	2-2	7,500	Halilovic 29', Weber H. 66'
34	16.05.1986	H	Sturm Graz	2-1	2,900	Kranjcar 6', Pacult 57'
35	23.05.1986	A	Austria Wien	3-1	11,000	Kienast R. 52', Hristic 81', Kranjcar 88'
36	30.05.1986	H	Wacker Innsbruck	3-3	12,000	Willfurth 24', Halilovic 39', Hristic 89' (pen.)

=== Cup ===
Rd	Date	Venue	Opponent	Res.	Att.	Goals and discipline
R4	03.09.1985	H	FavAC	4-1	1,400	Krankl 12', Halilovic 35' 61', Kranjcar 44'
R16	01.04.1986	H	Austria Salzburg	6-0	1,900	Kienast R. 25' 42', Weber H. 29', Willfurth 35', Hartwig 56' (o.g.), Halilovic 63'
QF	15.04.1986	H	Leoben	3-0	5,000	Lainer 20', Pacult 55' (pen.), Willfurth 90'
SF	29.04.1986	H	Austria Klagenfurt	2-0	3,000	Pacult 25' 70'
F	06.05.1986	N	Austria Wien	4-6 (a.e.t.)	16,500	Halilovic 7' (pen.), Kienast R. 45' 101', Kranjcar 62'

=== Cup Winners' Cup ===
Rd	Date	Venue	Opponent	Res.	Att.	Goals and discipline
R1-L1	18.09.1985	H	Tatabánya (Hungary)	5-0	15,500	Halilovic 19' 69' 73', Kienast R. 58', Krankl 62'
R1-L2	02.10.1985	A	Tatabánya (Hungary)	1-1	5,000	Weinhofer 61'
R2-L1	23.10.1985	H	Fram Reykjavík (Iceland)	3-0	14,500	Kranjcar 17', Pacult 80' 84'
R2-L2	06.11.1985	A	Fram Reykjavík (Iceland)	1-2	450	Pacult 66'
QF-L1	05.03.1986	H	Dynamo Kyiv (Soviet Union)	1-4	12,000	Willfurth 84'
QF-L2	19.03.1986	A	Dynamo Kyiv (Soviet Union)	1-5	104,000	Halilovic 27'
