= Andi Herzog =

Austrian footballer and manager

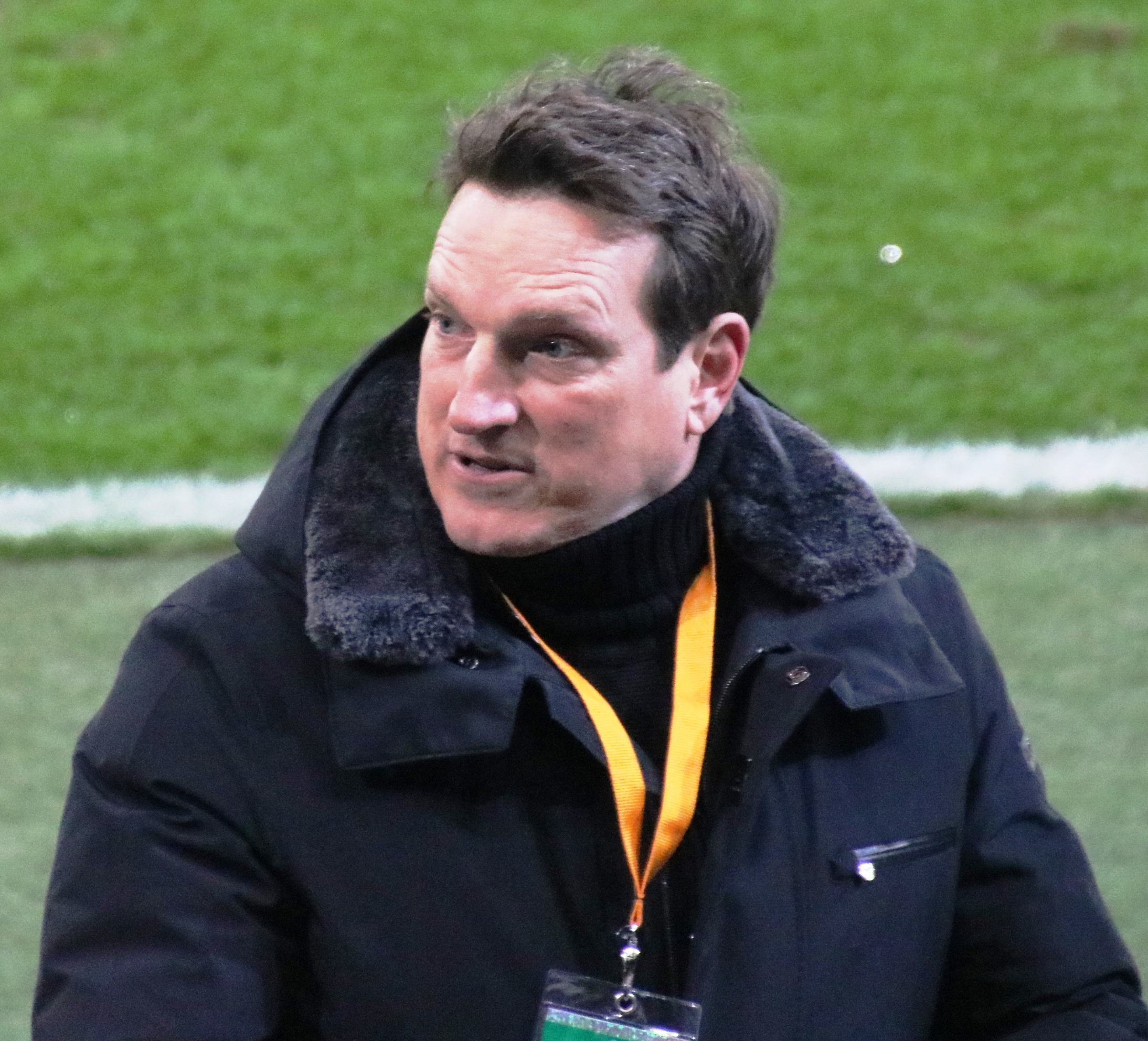
- Herzog in 2018

Personal information
- Full name: Andreas Herzog
- Date of birth: 10 September 1968 (age 58)
- Place of birth: Vienna, Austria
- Height: 1.84 m (6 ft 0 in)
- Position: Attacking midfielder

Senior career*
| Years | Team | Apps | (Gls) |
| 1986–1992 | Rapid Wien | 133 | (33) |
| 1988 | → First Vienna (loan) | 7 | (3) |
| 1992–1995 | Werder Bremen | 94 | (26) |
| 1995–1996 | Bayern Munich | 28 | (2) |
| 1996–2001 | Werder Bremen | 142 | (32) |
| 2002–2003 | Rapid Wien | 41 | (4) |
| 2004 | Los Angeles Galaxy | 27 | (4) |
| Total | | 472 | (104) |

International career
| 1988–2003 | Austria | 103 | (26) |

Managerial career
- 2005: Austria (caretaker)
- 2008–2009: Austria (assistant coach)
- 2009–2011: Austria U21
- 2011–2016: United States (assistant coach)
- 2015–2016: United States U23
- 2018–2020: Israel
- 2021–2022: Admira Wacker
- 2023–2024: South Korea (assistant coach)
- * Club domestic league appearances and goals

Andreas "Andi" Herzog (born 10 September 1968) is an Austrian former footballer and manager who most recently was the assistant manager of South Korea. As a player, he played as an attacking midfielder, most notably for Werder Bremen. A full international between 1988 and 2003, he won 103 caps and scored 26 goals for the Austria national team. He represented his country at the 1990 and 1998 FIFA World Cups.

== Club career ==
Born in Vienna, Austria, Herzog started his career at local giants Rapid Vienna, but was sent out on loan to city rivals First Vienna during 1987–88. That move proved to be successful and he was soon recalled to Rapid to start the 1988–89 season. He made his name at Rapid in the next years to secure a move to Bundesliga side Werder Bremen where he would spend eight years, divided in two periods by a season at Bayern Munich where he won the 1996 UEFA Cup, beating Girondins de Bordeaux in a two-legged final.

After returning to Rapid in 2002, he decided to end his career with Major League Soccer franchise Los Angeles Galaxy in 2004. Under head coach, Sigi Schmid, Herzog played well but following a mid-season coaching change, he saw his playing time decrease and at the end of the season, Herzog announced his retirement from football on 10 November 2004.

A stylish attacking midfielder, Herzog was well known for his ability to score stunning free-kicks. He captained the Rapid Wien side and was chosen in Rapid's Team of the Century in 1999.

== International career ==
Herzog made his debut for Austria in an April 1988 friendly match against Greece and was a participant at the 1990 and 1998 World Cups, scoring one goal in the latter tournament, a spot kick against Italy. Herzog surpassed striker Anton Polster's appearances record for Austria in May 2002 when winning his 96th against Germany. His last international was an April 2003 friendly match against Scotland. He altogether earned 103 caps, scoring 26 goals, making him Austria's most capped player until Marko Arnautović overtook with his 104th Austria cap on 26 September 2022.

== Managerial career ==
On 23 January 2015, Herzog was named coach of USA's under 23s.

On 1 August 2018, Herzog was announced as coach of Israel's national team, a move which was divisive due to his last minute goal in the final game of the 2002 World Cup qualifier to deny Israel a place in the play-offs. Midfielder Eyal Berkovic said of the appointment, "Whoever made this decision needs urgent psychiatric attention, I can't think of any other explanation for the appointment. It's a huge disgrace." On 24 June 2020, he left his position after almost two years in charge, while Israel's Sports Director and Austrian colleague of his Willibald Ruttensteiner replaced him as Israel's head coach.

== Personal life ==
Andreas Herzog is married, has two sons and lives in Breitenfurt bei Wien.

His father is Anton "Burli" Herzog (born 1941), who played in the Austrian Bundesliga between 1961 and 1975 for clubs like Austria Wien, Wiener Sport-Club and Admira/Wacker Mödling. Herzog junior grew up with his family in Vienna-Meidling, where he attended Singrienergasse grammar school.

== Career statistics ==
=== Club ===
Appearances and goals by club, season and competition
| Club | Season | League | | | Cup | | Continental | | Other | | Total | | Ref. |
| Club | Season | Division | Apps | Goals | Apps | Goals | Apps | Goals | Apps | Goals | Apps | Goals | Ref. |
|---|---|---|---|---|---|---|---|---|---|---|---|---|---|
| Rapid Wien | 1986–87 | Austrian Bundesliga | 4 | 0 | | | | | | | 4 | 0 | |
| Rapid Wien | 1987–88 | Austrian Bundesliga | 5 | 0 | | | | | | | 5 | 0 | |
| Rapid Wien | 1988–89 | Austrian Bundesliga | 21 | 5 | | | 2 | 0 | 13 (Note: 13 appearances, three goals in Bundesliga playoffs) | 3 | 36 | 8 | |
| Rapid Wien | 1989–90 | Austrian Bundesliga | 15 | 3 | 1 | 0 | 6 | 0 | 12 (Note: Twelve appearances, five goals in Bundesliga playoffs) | 5 | 34 | 8 | |
| Rapid Wien | 1990–91 | Austrian Bundesliga | 19 | 4 | 1 | 0 | 2 | 0 | 11 (Note: Eleven appearances, two goals in Bundesliga playoffs) | 2 | 33 | 6 | |
| Rapid Wien | 1991–92 | Austrian Bundesliga | 21 | 8 | | | | | 12 (Note: Twelve appearances, three goals in Bundesliga playoffs) | 3 | 33 | 11 | |
| Rapid Wien | Total | | 85 | 20 | 2 | 0 | 10 | 0 | 48 | 13 | 145 | 33 | – |
| First Vienna | 1987–88 | Austrian Bundesliga | | | | | | | 7 (Note: Seven appearances, three goals in Bundesliga playoffs) | 3 | 7 | 3 | |
| Werder Bremen | 1992–93 | Bundesliga | 33 | 10 | 3 | 1 | 3 | 0 | 2 (Note: Two appearances in UEFA Super Cup) | 0 | 41 | 11 | |
| Werder Bremen | 1993–94 | Bundesliga | 30 | 6 | 4 | 2 | 8 | 0 | 1 (Note: One appearance in German Super Cup) | 0 | 43 | 8 | |
| Werder Bremen | 1994–95 | Bundesliga | 31 | 10 | 1 | 0 | 3 | 0 | 1 (Note: One appearance in German Super Cup) | 0 | 36 | 10 | |
| Werder Bremen | Total | | 94 | 26 | 8 | 3 | 14 | 0 | 11 | 0 | 127 | 29 | – |
| Bayern Munich | 1995–96 | Bundesliga | 28 | 2 | | | 7 | 2 | | | 35 | 4 | |
| Werder Bremen | 1996–97 | Bundesliga | 29 | 15 | 3 | 0 | 1 | 1 | 0 | 0 | 33 | 16 | |
| Werder Bremen | 1997–98 | Bundesliga | 18 | 4 | 2 | 0 | 0 | 0 | 0 | 0 | 20 | 4 | |
| Werder Bremen | 1998–99 | Bundesliga | 27 | 3 | 3 | 0 | 3 | 2 | 0 | 0 | 33 | 5 | |
| Werder Bremen | 1999–00 | Bundesliga | 27 | 6 | 5 | 0 | 9 | 2 | 0 | 0 | 41 | 8 | |
| Werder Bremen | 2000–01 | Bundesliga | 32 | 2 | 1 | 1 | 6 | 1 | 0 | 0 | 39 | 4 | |
| Werder Bremen | 2001–02 | Bundesliga | 9 | 1 | 0 | 0 | 2 | 1 | 0 | 0 | 11 | 2 | |
| Werder Bremen | Total | | 142 | 31 | 14 | 1 | 21 | 7 | 0 | 0 | 177 | 39 | – |
| Rapid Wien | 2001–02 | Austrian Bundesliga | 12 | 1 | 1 | 0 | 0 | 0 | 0 | 0 | 13 | 1 | |
| Rapid Wien | 2002–03 | Austrian Bundesliga | 29 | 3 | 1 | 0 | 0 | 0 | 0 | 0 | 30 | 3 | |
| Rapid Wien | Total | | 41 | 4 | 2 | 0 | 0 | 0 | 0 | 0 | 43 | 4 | – |
| Los Angeles Galaxy | 2004 | Major League Soccer | 27 | 4 | 0 | 0 | 0 | 0 | 1 (Note: One appearance in Major League Soccer playoffs) | 0 | 28 | 4 | |
| Career total | | | 417 | 87 | 26 | 4 | 52 | 9 | 60 | 16 | 555 | 116 | – |

=== International ===
Scores and results list Austria's goal tally first, score column indicates score after each Herzog goal.

List of international goals scored by Andi Herzog
| No. | Date | Venue | Opponent | Score | Result | Competition |
|---|---|---|---|---|---|---|
| 1 | 2 November 1988 | Praterstadion, Vienna | Turkey | 2–0 | 3–2 | 1990 World Cup qualifier |
| 2 | 2 November 1988 | Praterstadion, Vienna | Turkey | 3–0 | 3–2 | 1990 World Cup qualifier |
| 3 | 11 April 1989 | Bundesstadion, Graz | Czechoslovakia | 1–1 | 1–2 | Friendly |
| 4 | 28 October 1992 | Praterstadion, Vienna | Israel | 1–0 | 5–2 | 1994 World Cup qualifier |
| 5 | 28 October 1992 | Praterstadion, Vienna | Israel | 2–0 | 5–2 | 1994 World Cup qualifier |
| 6 | 25 August 1993 | Ernst-Happel-Stadion, Vienna | Finland | 3–0 | 3–0 | 1994 World Cup qualifier |
| 7 | 13 October 1993 | Vasil Levski National Stadium, Sofia | Bulgaria | 1–2 | 1–4 | 1994 World Cup qualifier |
| 8 | 10 November 1993 | Ernst-Happel-Stadion, Vienna | Sweden | 1–1 | 1–1 | 1994 World Cup qualifier |
| 9 | 29 March 1995 | Stadion Lehen, Salzburg | Latvia | 1–0 | 5–0 | Euro 1996 qualifier |
| 10 | 29 March 1995 | Stadion Lehen, Salzburg | Latvia | 3–0 | 5–0 | Euro 1996 qualifier |
| 11 | 9 October 1996 | Råsunda Stadium, Stockholm | Sweden | 1–0 | 1–0 | 1998 World Cup qualifier |
| 12 | 9 November 1996 | Ernst-Happel-Stadion, Vienna | Latvia | 2–1 | 2–1 | 1998 World Cup qualifier |
| 13 | 6 September 1997 | Ernst-Happel Stadion, Vienna | Sweden | 1–0 | 1–0 | 1998 World Cup qualifier |
| 14 | 23 June 1998 | Stade de France, Saint-Denis | Italy | 1–2 | 1–2 | 1998 World Cup |
| 15 | 10 March 1999 | Espenmoos, St. Gallen | Switzerland | 1–0 | 4–2 | Friendly |
| 16 | 10 March 1999 | Espenmoos, St. Gallen | Switzerland | 4–2 | 4–2 | Friendly |
| 17 | 28 April 1999 | Arnold Schwarzenegger-Stadium, Graz | San Marino | 6–0 | 7–0 | Euro 2000 qualifier |
| 18 | 10 October 1999 | Ernst-Happel-Stadion, Vienna | Cyprus | 3–1 | 3–1 | Euro 2000 qualifier |
| 19 | 1 September 2000 | Ernst-Happel-Stadion, Vienna | Iran | 1–1 | 5–1 | Friendly |
| 20 | 28 March 2001 | Ernst-Happel-Stadion, Vienna | Israel | 2–1 | 2–1 | 2002 World Cup qualifier |
| 21 | 15 August 2001 | Ernst-Happel-Stadion, Vienna | Switzerland | 1–1 | 1–2 | Friendly |
| 22 | 5 September 2001 | Ernst-Happel-Stadion, Vienna | Bosnia and Herzegovina | 1–0 | 2–0 | 2002 World Cup qualifier |
| 23 | 5 September 2001 | Ernst-Happel-Stadion, Vienna | Bosnia and Herzegovina | 2–0 | 2–0 | 2002 World Cup qualifier |
| 24 | 27 October 2001 | Ramat Gan Stadium, Ramat Gan | Israel | 1–1 | 1–1 | 2002 World Cup qualifier |
| 25 | 7 September 2002 | Ernst-Happel-Stadion, Vienna | Moldova | 1–0 | 2–0 | Euro 2004 qualifier |
| 26 | 7 September 2002 | Ernst-Happel-Stadion, Vienna | Moldova | 2–0 | 2–0 | Euro 2004 qualifier |

== Honours ==
Rapid Wien

- Austrian Football Bundesliga: 1986–87, 1987–88

Werder Bremen

- Bundesliga: 1992–93
- DFB-Pokal: 1993–94, 1998–99
- DFL-Supercup: 1993, 1994

Bayern Munich

- UEFA Cup: 1995–96

Individual

- Austrian Footballer of the Year: 1992
- kicker Bundesliga Team of the Season: 1994–95

== Managerial statistics ==
As of 18 September 2021

| Team | From | To | Record | | | | |
| Team | From | To | G | W | D | L | Win % |
|---|---|---|---|---|---|---|---|
| Austria U-21 | 4 March 2009 | 31 December 2011 | 28 | 13 | 6 | 9 | 46.43 |
| United States U-23 | 23 January 2015 | 22 November 2016 | 16 | 9 | 0 | 7 | 56.25 |
| Israel | 1 August 2018 | 24 June 2020 | 16 | 6 | 2 | 8 | 37.50 |
| Admira Wacker | 1 July 2021 | 30 June 2022 | 9 | 3 | 3 | 3 | 33.33 |
| Total | | | 69 | 31 | 11 | 27 | 44.93 |

== See also ==
- List of men's footballers with 100 or more international caps
