= Daniel Madlener =

Austrian football manager

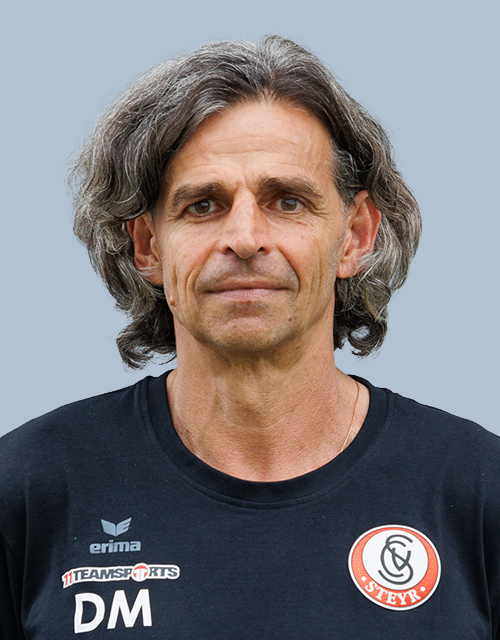

Personal information
- Date of birth: 24 August 1964 (age 62)
- Place of birth: Feldkirch, Austria
- Height: 1.75 m (5 ft 9 in)
- Position: Midfielder

Senior career*
Years	Team	Apps	(Gls)
1984–1985	SC Bregenz		
1985–1987	FC St. Gallen	15	(0)
1987–1991	SK Vorwärts Steyr	80	(15)
1991–1992	SK Rapid Wien	16	(0)
1992–1996	SK Vorwärts Steyr	92	(5)
1996–1998	FC Linz	45	(6)
1998	TSV Hartberg	13	(4)
1998–1999	SK Vorwärts Steyr	25	(0)
1999–2000	FC Hard	27	(0)
2000–2001	FC Blau-Weiß Feldkirch	22	(0)
2001–2003	FC Nenzing	16	(0)
2003–2005	VfB Hohenems	3	(0)
2005–2009	FC Schlins		
2009–2011	FC Rätia Bludenz		

International career
1988	Austria	2	(0)

Managerial career
- 2001: FC Nenzing
- 2005–2009: FC Schlins
- 2009–2011: FC Rätia Bludenz
- 2011–2012: FC Andelsbuch
- 2013: FC Lustenau 07
- 2014–2015: AKA Vorarlberg
- 2016–2021: SC Bregenz
- 2021–2023: SK Vorwärts Steyr
- * Club domestic league appearances and goals

Daniel Madlener (born 24 August 1964) is an Austrian football manager and a former player.

== Career ==
In 1987/88, Madlener signed for SK Vorwärts Steyr in the Austrian second division. After arriving, he became their figurehead for his technique, long hair, and lifestyle. That season, he and Ukrainian striker Oleg Blokhin, 1975 European Footballer of the Year, helped the club achieve promotion to the Austrian Bundesliga. As a result of his performances, Madlener played for the Austria national team and earned a move to SK Rapid Wien, Austria's most successful team before returning to SK Vorwärts Steyr after a year. In 1995/96, SK Vorwärts Steyr reached the round of 16 of the UEFA Intertoto Cup, but were relegated at the end of the season.

After retiring, Madlener worked as a teacher and coached amateur teams, helping Andelsbuch achieve promotion to the third division in 2011/12, the first time the club played above the fourth division. However, he did not stay because he claimed that they were "a village club whose top priority is to only use its own players" and was appointed head coach of professional second division side Lustenau 07 in 2013, his only full-time professional coaching job.
