= Roland Schrammel =

Austrian footballer

Personal information
- Date of birth: 11 September 1968 (age 58)
- Position: Goalkeeper

Senior career*
Years	Team	Apps	(Gls)
1991–1994	Rapid Wien	13	(0)
- * Club domestic league appearances and goals

Roland Schrammel (born 11 September 1968) is an Austrian former footballer.
