= Zoran Stojadinović =

Serbian footballer and agent

Zoran Stojadinović Зоран Стојадиновић
Personal information
- Full name: Zoran Stojadinović
- Date of birth: 25 April 1961 (age 65)
- Place of birth: Šabac, FPR Yugoslavia
- Height: 1.86 m (6 ft 1 in)
- Position: Forward

Youth career
- Red Star Belgrade

Senior career*
Years	Team	Apps	(Gls)
1979–1980	OFK Beograd	5	(0)
1980–1981	Rijeka	4	(0)
1981–1984	Galenika Zemun	59	(6)
1984–1986	OFK Beograd	62	(13)
1986–1987	Admira Wacker	30	(14)
1987–1989	Rapid Wien	41	(29)
1989–1990	Mallorca	46	(18)
1990–1992	Deportivo La Coruña	29	(9)
1992–1993	Figueres	32	(9)
Total		308	(98)
- * Club domestic league appearances and goals

Zoran Stojadinović (Serbian Cyrillic: Зоран Стојадиновић; born 25 April 1961) is a Serbian former footballer, currently a players agent.

== Club career ==
The 1990–91 season saw Deportivo finishing as runners-up, finally achieving promotion to La Liga after an 18-year absence. Stojadinovic scored the two goals against Real Murcia during the last game 2–0 with Deportivo.

== Honours ==
As a player:

- (Austria) Rapid Wien
  - 1 time Austrian Football Bundesliga Champion: 1987–88
  - 1 time Austrian Football Bundesliga top-scorer: 1987–88 (27 goals in 32 matches)

== Post-playing ==
After finishing his playing career, Stojadinović began working as players agent. He mostly dealt in transfers of Serbian players to, from, and within Spain. The very first transfer Stojadinović handled was Jovan Stanković's move from Red Star Belgrade to Real Mallorca in 1996.

In November 2012, he accepted an administrative position with Red Star Belgrade, becoming the club's new sporting director. However, he was sacked on 13 February 2014 by club management.
