= Alyaksandr Myatlitski =

Belarusian footballer (born 1964)

Alyaksandr Myatlitskiy
Personal information
- Date of birth: 22 April 1964 (age 62)
- Place of birth: Minsk, Byelorussian SSR, Soviet Union
- Height: 1.85 m (6 ft 1 in)
- Position: Defender

Youth career
- 1981–1984: Dinamo Minsk

Senior career*
Years	Team	Apps	(Gls)
1984–1990	Dinamo Minsk	109	(11)
1990–1991	Osijek	18	(4)
1991–1993	Rapid Wien	58	(9)
1993–1997	LASK Linz	98	(12)
1998–1999	Vorwärts Steyr	40	(8)
2000–2003	ASKÖ Pasching	77	(9)
Total		396	(53)

International career
1992–1997	Belarus	9	(0)
- * Club domestic league appearances and goals

Alyaksandr Myatlitski (Belarusian: Аляксандр Мятліцкі, Russian: Александр Метлицкий; born 22 April 1964) is a Belarusian former professional footballer who played as a defender for Dinamo Minsk in the Soviet Top League, NK Osijek in the Yugoslav First League, and Rapid Wien, LASK Linz and ASKÖ Pasching in the Austrian Bundesliga.

Myatlitski made nine appearances for the Belarus national team.

On 29 December 2009, Myatlitski was named as a sporting director for Heart of Midlothian.
