= Andreas Reisinger =

Austrian footballer and manager

Personal information
- Full name: Andreas Reisinger
- Date of birth: 14 October 1963 (age 63)
- Place of birth: Vienna, Austria
- Height: 1.77 m (5 ft 10 in)
- Position: Midfielder

Team information
- Current team: SV Wienerberg (Head coach)

Senior career*
Years	Team	Apps	(Gls)
1983–1986	Favoritner AC	41	(1)
1986–1989	Wiener Sportclub	109	(11)
1989–1991	Rapid Wien	58	(6)
1991–1994	SV Casino Salzburg	65	(2)
1994	Vorwärts Steyr	0	(0)
1994–1997	Wiener Sportclub		

International career
1989–1990	Austria	10	(0)

Managerial career
- 1997: Wiener-SC
- 2001: Floridsdorfer AC (interim manager)
- 2002–2003: Kremser SC
- 2005–2011: Rapid Wien II
- 2012: FC Tulln
- 2013: SC Perchtoldsdorf
- 2013–2014: SC Wiener Viktoria
- 2014–2015: SV Wimpassing
- 2015–2016: Wiener-SC
- 2017–2018: FC Purkersdorf
- 2020–: SV Wienerberg
- * Club domestic league appearances and goals

Andreas Reisinger (born 14 October 1963) is an Austrian football manager and former player. He is currently in charge of SV Wienerberg.

== Club career ==
Born in Vienna, the midfielder mostly played for hometown clubs, the most prominent being Rapid Wien. He also spent three seasons with SV Casino Salzburg, for whom he played 10 games in their title-winning 1993/1994 season.

== International career ==
Reisinger made his debut for Austria in an April 1989 friendly match against Czechoslovakia and was a participant at the 1990 FIFA World Cup. There is a common misconception that he played as number 22. However, his actual number was 16.

He earned 10 caps, no goals scored. His final international was an October 1990 European Championship qualification match against Yugoslavia.

== Honours ==
- Austrian Football Bundesliga (1):
  - 1994
