= Mladen Munjaković =

Croatian footballer (born 1961)

Personal information
- Date of birth: 20 July 1961 (age 65)
- Place of birth: Žerjavinec, SFR Yugoslavia
- Position: Defender

Youth career
- 1972-1981: Dinamo Zagreb

Senior career*
Years	Team	Apps	(Gls)
1980–1986	Dinamo Zagreb	128	(9)
1988–1989	Rapid Wien	26	(1)
1989–1990	Olimpija Ljubljana	4	(0)
1990–1992	Levante	33	(6)
1992–1993	Segesta	14	(5)

Managerial career
- 1999-2001: Segesta (sports dir.)
- * Club domestic league appearances and goals

Mladen Munjaković (born 20 July 1961) is a Croatian former professional footballer who played as a defender.

== Career ==
Munjaković began his career with NK Dinamo Zagreb in the Yugoslav First League, where he won the league in the 1981–82 season and the Yugoslav Cup in 1983. He totalled 430 games for the club, but missed a big part of their league title winning season due to him joining the army.

Munjaković went abroad in 1988, joining Rapid Wien in the Austrian Football Bundesliga. He later played for Levante UD in the Spanish Segunda División and Segesta.

== Personal life ==
Munjaković hails from Žerjavinac, a small village near Sesvete and is married to Natali Lokin. They have a daughter, Tena.

== External sources ==
- Mladen Munjaković at WorldFootball.net
- Mladen Munjaković at BDFutbol
- https://gnkdinamopovijest.blogspot.com/2011/05/momcad-po-sezonama.html
- http://forum.b92.net/topic/29741-ex-yu-fudbalska-statistika-po-godinama/page__st__75
