= Gerald Willfurth =

Austrian footballer

Personal information
- Full name: Gerald Willfurth
- Date of birth: 6 November 1962 (age 63)
- Place of birth: Austria
- Position: Midfielder

Senior career*
Years	Team	Apps	(Gls)
1980–1981	ASK Bad Fischau-Brunn		
1981–1989	Rapid Wien	204	(41)
1989–1993	Austria Salzburg	113	(14)
1993–1995	ASK Bad Fischau-Brunn		
1996–1997	Kottingbrunn		
1998	Eisenstadt		
1998-2000	1. Wiener Neustädter SC		

International career
1983–1991	Austria	30	(3)
- * Club domestic league appearances and goals

Gerald Willfurth (born 6 November 1962) is a retired football midfielder from Austria.

== Club career ==
During his club career, Willfurth notably played for Rapid Wien and SV Austria Salzburg. With Rapid he won 4 league titles, 4 domestic cups and became runner-up in the 1985 Cup Winners' Cup. He also played for lower league sides.

== International career ==
He made his debut for Austria in a June 1983 European Championship qualification match away against Albania, coming on as a 88ht-minute substitute for Felix Gasselich, and earned a total of 30 caps, scoring 3 goals. His final international was an April 1991 friendly match against Norway.

== Honours ==
- Austrian Championship: 4

1982, 1983, 1987, 1988

- Austrian Cup: 4

1982–83, 1983–84, 1984–85, 1986–87
