= Sergey Shavlo =

Russian footballer (born 1956)

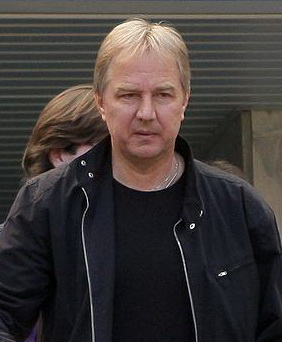

Personal information
- Full name: Sergey Dmitriyevich Shavlo
- Date of birth: 4 September 1956 (age 70)
- Place of birth: Nikopol, Ukrainian SSR
- Height: 1.81 m (5 ft 11 in)
- Position: Midfielder

Youth career
- Trubnik Nikopol

Senior career*
Years	Team	Apps	(Gls)
1974–1975	Elektrons Rīga		
1975–1976	FK Daugava Rīga	64	(10)
1977–1982	FC Spartak Moscow	166	(34)
1983	Iskra Smolensk	40	(9)
1984–1985	FC Spartak Moscow	57	(11)
1986–1987	FC Torpedo Moscow	45	(1)
1987–1989	SK Rapid Wien	22	(2)
1989–1990	Favoritner AC		
1990–1992	Eintracht Wien		
1992–1993	SV Gerasdorf		
1993–1997	Laxenburg		

International career
1979–1985	USSR	19	(0)

Managerial career
- 1994–2000: SK Rapid Wien (staff)
- 1999–2002: SK Rapid Wien (staff)
- 2000–2001: FC Brunn (Austria)
- 2003: Torpedo-Metallurg (staff)
- 2004–2005: FC Spartak Moscow (scout)
- 2005–2008: FC Spartak Moscow (staff)
- * Club domestic league appearances and goals

Olympic medal record

Representing Soviet Union

Men's Football
Bronze medal – third place	1980 Moscow	Team competition

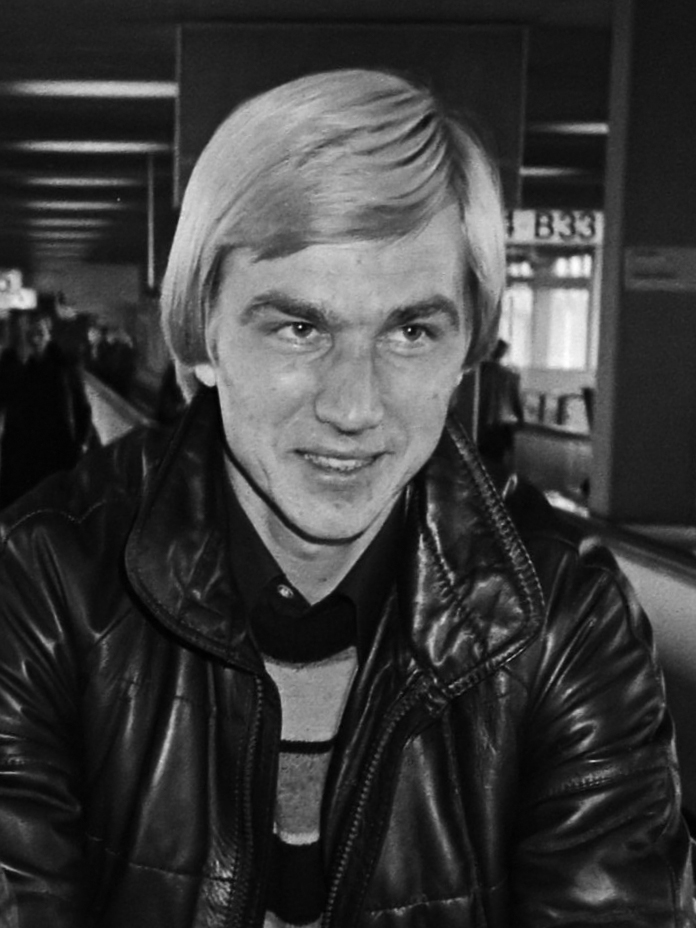
Sergey Shavlo in 1982

Sergey Dmitriyevich Shavlo (Russian: Серге́й Дмитриевич Шавло; born 4 September 1956) is a former Soviet and Ukrainian/Russian footballer.

== Playing biography ==
Shavlo made his name as a footballer in Latvia – at first he played for Elektrons Rīga but soon he caught the eye of FK Daugava Rīga management and transferred to the top Latvian team. For Daugava he played two years and then he moved to Spartak Moscow which was then playing together with Daugava in the first Soviet league and was undergoing a hard time with generation of players change. The mobile midfielder with a good pass came in handy for the Konstantin Beskov side and in 1977 with Shavlo Spartak returned to the top division and in 1979 – won the Soviet championship. In 1986 Shavlo moved to Torpedo Moscow with which he won the Soviet Cup.

Shavlo also played in the Soviet national football team capping 19 appearances. With the Soviet Olympic football team he won a bronze medal at the 1980 Summer Olympics.

Despite his already veteran age in 1987 Shavlo moved to Rapid Vienna thus becoming one of the first Soviet footballers to play abroad. After a couple of seasons he went on to coach different Austrian and Russian teams.

In 2004 Shavlo returned to Spartak, first working as a scout but in September 2005 he was appointed director of the club. He worked in that capability till 7 August 2008 when his contract ran out and he decided not to renew it.

== Achievements ==
- Soviet Top League
  - Winner: 1 (1979)
  - Runner-up: 4 (1980, 1981, 1984,1985)
  - 3rd position: 1 (1982)
- Soviet First League
  - Winner: 1 (1977)
- Soviet Cup
  - Winner: 1 (1986)
  - Runner-up: 1 (1981)
- Austrian Bundesliga
  - Winner: 1 (1988)
- Olympic Games
  - Bronze medal: 1 (1980)
