= Andreas Poiger =

Austrian footballer

Personal information
- Full name: Andreas Poiger
- Date of birth: 4 April 1968 (age 58)
- Position: Defender

Senior career*
Years	Team	Apps	(Gls)
1987–1989	Wiener Sport-Club		
1989–1993	Rapid Wien	79	(2)
1993–1994	Vfb Mödling		
1994–1995	FC Tirol Innsbruck		
1995–1997	Vfb Mödling		
1997–2005	Stockerau		

International career
1990	Austria	1	(0)
- * Club domestic league appearances and goals

Andreas Poiger (born 4 April 1968) is an Austrian former international footballer.
