= Heimo Pfeifenberger =

Austrian footballer and manager

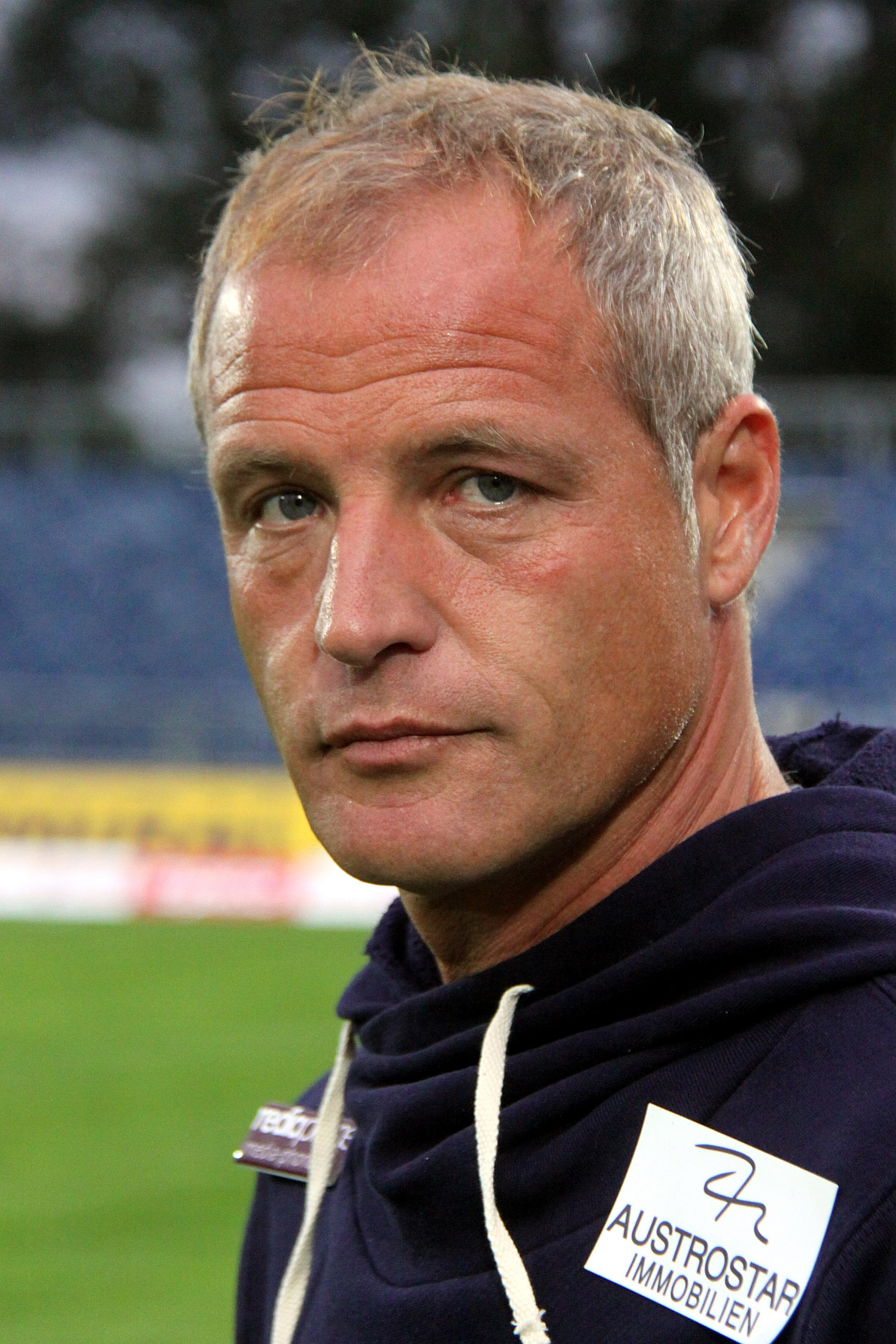
- Pfeifenberger as Wiener Neustadt manager in 2014

Personal information
- Date of birth: 29 December 1966 (age 59)
- Place of birth: Zederhaus, Austria
- Height: 1.83 m (6 ft 0 in)
- Positions: Striker; winger

Team information
- Current team: SV Grödig (manager)

Youth career
- 1971–1987: USV Zederhaus

Senior career*
Years	Team	Apps	(Gls)
1987–1988	Austria Salzburg	30	(13)
1988–1992	Rapid Wien	117	(42)
1992–1996	SV Wüstenrot Salzburg	122	(58)
1996–1998	Werder Bremen	43	(5)
1998–2005	Austria Salzburg	91	(15)
2007	Seekirchen	4	(4)
2007	SV Grödig	2	(1)
Total		409	(138)

International career
1989–1998	Austria	40	(9)

Managerial career
- 2005–2007: Red Bull Salzburg (youth)
- 2007–2009: SV Grödig
- 2009–2010: Austria U-21 (assistant)
- 2010: SPG Axams-Götzens
- 2010–2012: SV Grödig
- 2012–2014: SC Wiener Neustadt
- 2015–2018: Wolfsberger AC
- 2020: FK Sūduva
- 2020–: SV Grödig
- * Club domestic league appearances and goals

Heimo Pfeifenberger (born 29 December 1966) is an Austrian professional football manager and a former player. He is the manager of SV Grödig.

== Club career ==
On club level Pfeifenberger played for USV Zederhaus (youth career), Austria Salzburg, Werder Bremen, SK Rapid Wien, SV Seekirchen 1945 and SV Grödig. He celebrated most success at Austria Salzburg. In 1994 and 1995, Pfeifenberger won the league title and the Austrian Supercup with Salzburg. He played in the first leg of the 1994 UEFA Cup Final which they lost to Inter Milan. In the Austrian 1993–94 season, he became Bundesliga top scorer with 14 goals. In total he scored 74 goals for Salzburg and 43 for Rapid, making him one of the best goalscorers in the Austrian league.

== International career ==
Pfeifenberger made his debut for Austria in an August 1989 World Cup qualification match against Iceland and was a participant at the 1990 FIFA World Cup and the 1998 FIFA World Cup. He earned 40 caps, scoring nine goals. His last international was an August 1998 friendly match against France.

=== International goals ===
Scores and results list Austria's goal tally first.

No	Date	Venue	Opponent	Score	Result	Competition
1.	23 August 1989	Stadion Lehen, Salzburg, Austria	Iceland	1–0	2–1	1990 World Cup qualifier
2.	22 May 1991	Stadion Lehen, Salzburg, Austria	Faroe Islands	1–0	3–0	Euro 1992 qualifier
3.	19 August 1992	Tehelné pole, Bratislava, Slovakia	Czechoslovakia	2–0	2–2	Friendly match
4.	10 March 1993	Ernst-Happel-Stadion, Vienna, Austria	Greece	1–0	2–1	Friendly match
5.	14 April 1993	Ernst-Happel-Stadion, Vienna, Austria	Bulgaria	1–0	3–1	1994 World Cup qualifier
6.	25 August 1993	Ernst-Happel-Stadion, Vienna, Austria	Finland	2–0	3–0	1994 World Cup qualifier
7.	23 March 1994	Linzer Stadion, Linz, Austria	Hungary	1–1	1–1	Friendly match
8.	29 March 1995	Stadion Lehen, Salzburg, Austria	Latvia	2–0	5–0	Euro 1996 qualifier
9.	10 September 1997	Dinamo Stadium, Minsk, Belarus	Belarus	1–0	1–0	1998 World Cup qualifier

== Coaching career ==
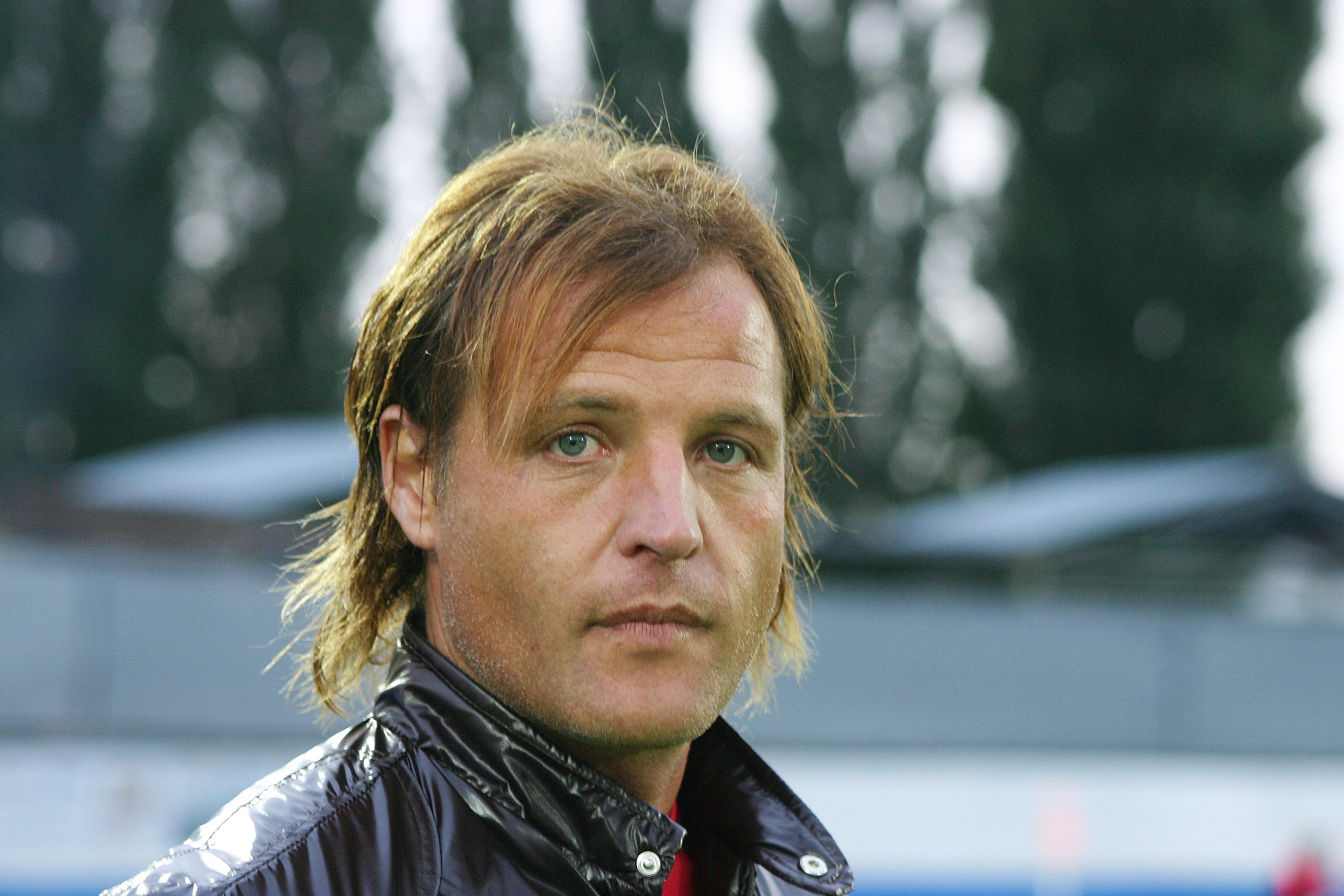
Pfeifenberger with SV Grödig in 2008

Pfeifenberger was hired as the new coach of Wiener Neustadt on 30 May 2012. He left the club on 12 November 2014. On 25 November 2015, Pfeifenberger was unveiled as the new manager of Wolfsberger AC, replacing Dietmar Kühbauer.

On 8 January 2020, he became a head coach of Lithuanian defending champions FK Sūduva. The club terminated the contract on 14 April, just after two games.

On 1 July 2020, he returned to SV Grödig.

== Coaching record ==
As of 17 December 2016

Team	From	To	Record				
Team	From	To	G	W	D	L	Win %
SV Grödig	1 June 2007	12 December 2008	51	27	12	12	52.94
SPG Axams-Götzens	14 January 2010	4 April 2010	3	0	1	2	0.00
SV Grödig	4 April 2010	30 May 2010	87	38	19	30	43.68
SC Wiener Neustadt	30 May 2012	12 November 2014	94	24	23	47	25.53
Wolfsberger AC	25 November 2015	Present	41	14	11	16	34.15
Total			276	103	66	107	37.32

== Honours ==
- Austrian Football Bundesliga: 1993–94, 1994–95
- Austrian Bundesliga top goalscorer: 1993–94
