= Franz Resch =

Austrian footballer and manager

Personal information
- Date of birth: 4 May 1969 (age 57)
- Height: 1.82 m (5 ft 11 1/2 in)
- Position: Defender

Team information
- Current team: FC Kennelbach (manager)

Senior career*
Years	Team	Apps	(Gls)
1989–1993	SK Rapid Wien	64	(0)
1993	FC Admira/Wacker		
1994	FK Austria Wien		
1994–1997	FC Admira/Wacker		
1997	Motherwell F.C.	3	(0)
1997–1998	Darlington F.C.	17	(1)
1998–2004	FC Lustenau 07		

International career
1991	Austria	2	(0)

Managerial career
- ?–2008: FC Lauterach
- * Club domestic league appearances and goals as of 19:16, 22 March 2013 (UTC)

Franz Resch (born 4 May 1969) is a retired Austrian football player and a football manager currently managing FC Lauterach.
