= Horst Steiger =

Austrian footballer

Personal information
- Date of birth: 9 April 1970
- Place of birth: Austria
- Date of death: 1 October 1995 (aged 25)
- Place of death: Austria
- Position: Midfielder

Senior career*
Years	Team	Apps	(Gls)
–1989	SC Eisenstadt		
1989–1994	SK Rapid Wien	87	(7)
1994–1995	FC Admira Wacker Mödling	34	(1)
- * Club domestic league appearances and goals

Horst Steiger (9 April 1970 - 1 October 1995) was an Austrian footballer who played as a midfielder.

== Early life ==
Stieger was born in 1970 in Austria. He was the son of Helmut Steiger.

== Career ==
Stieger started his career with Austrian side SC Eisenstadt. In 1989, he signed for Austrian side SK Rapid Wien. In 1994, he signed for Austrian side FC Admira Wacker Mödling. He suffered relegation while playing for the club.

== Style of play ==
Stieger mainly operated as a midfielder. He was known for his dribbling ability.
