= Zlatko Kranjčar =

Croatian footballer and manager (1956–2021)

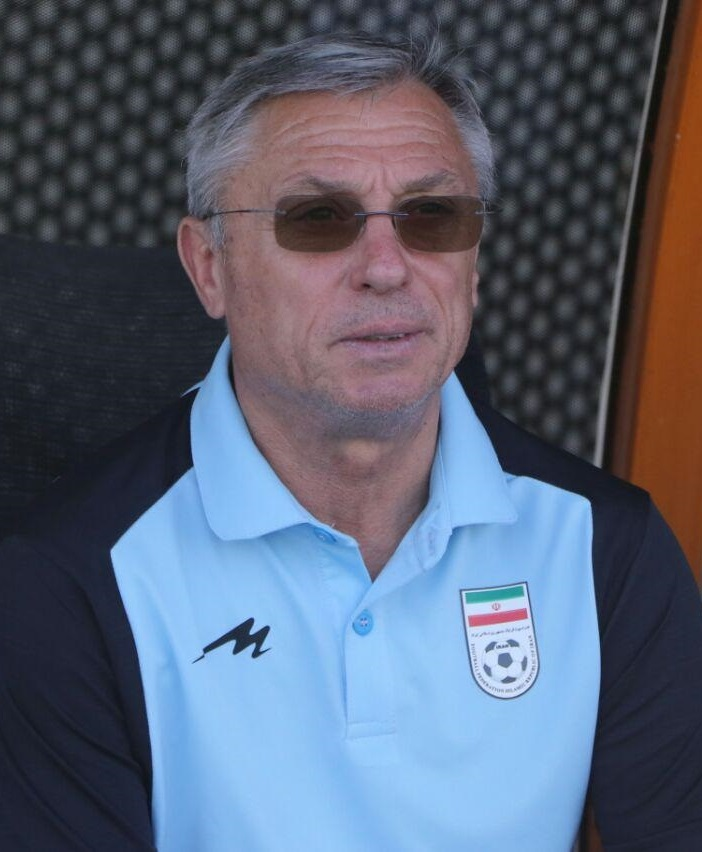
- Kranjčar as Iran U23 manager in 2019

Personal information
- Date of birth: 15 November 1956
- Place of birth: Zagreb, PR Croatia, FPR Yugoslavia
- Date of death: 1 March 2021 (aged 64)
- Place of death: Zagreb, Croatia
- Position: Striker

Youth career
- 1966–1973: Dinamo Zagreb

Senior career*
| Years | Team | Apps | (Gls) |
| 1973–1983 | Dinamo Zagreb | 261 | (98) |
| 1983–1990 | Rapid Wien | 201 | (106) |
| 1990–1991 | VSE St. Pölten | 12 | (2) |
| Total | | 474 | (206) |

International career
| 1972–1975 | Yugoslavia U19 | 19 | (0) |
| 1977–1983 | Yugoslavia | 11 | (3) |
| 1990 | Croatia | 2 | (1) |

Managerial career
- 1991–1992: Austria Klagenfurt
- 1992–1994: Segesta
- 1994–1996: Croatia Zagreb
- 1996: FC Linz
- 1997: Slaven Belupo
- 1997: Segesta
- 1997–1998: Samobor
- 1998: Dinamo Zagreb
- 1999–2000: El-Masry
- 2000: Mura
- 2000–2001: Marsonia
- 2001–2002: NK Zagreb
- 2002–2003: Rijeka
- 2003–2004: NK Zagreb
- 2004–2006: Croatia
- 2006–2007: Croatia Sesvete
- 2007: Al-Shaab Sharjah
- 2009: DAC Dunajská Streda
- 2009: Persepolis
- 2010–2011: Montenegro
- 2011–2014: Sepahan
- 2015–2016: Al-Ahli
- 2016: Dinamo Zagreb
- 2017–2018: Sepahan
- 2018–2019: Iran U23
Medal record
Men's football
Representing Yugoslavia
| Gold medal – first place | UEFA U-21 Euro | 1978 |
- * Club domestic league appearances and goals

Zlatko "Cico" Kranjčar (Croatian pronunciation: [zlâtko tsǐːtso krâɲtʃaːr]; 15 November 1956 – 1 March 2021) was a Croatian professional football manager and player.

Kranjčar started his career as a player with Dinamo Zagreb where he won the Yugoslav First League in 1981–82, then Yugoslav Cup twice in 1980 and 1983. He later became the manager of the club which is now part of independent Croatia and went on to win Croatian First League in 1995–96 and 1997–98 and the Croatian Cup twice in 1996 and 1998.

Kranjčar also played for Rapid Wien where he had success winning the Austrian Bundesliga twice in 1986–87 and 1987–88; the Austrian Cup in 1984, 1985 and 1987; and the Austrian Supercup in 1986, 1987 and 1988.

Kranjčar was appointed manager of the Croatia national team and took them to the 2006 World Cup. He also had a short spell with the Montenegro national team. In 2009 he went to Iran and managed Persepolis. While there he had two spells with Sepahan where he went on to win the Iran Pro League in 2011–12 and the Hazfi Cup in 2012–13.

== Playing career ==
=== Club ===
Kranjčar started to play for Dinamo Zagreb at the age of 10 in 1966 and stayed at the club until 1983. He debuted for the first team on 3 March 1974, aged 17, in a match against Hajduk Split. He played as a striker and quickly became one of the most popular players of the club. He appeared in a total of 556 matches for Dinamo, including friendlies, and scored a total of 256 goals, of which 98 were in the Yugoslav First League. With Dinamo, Kranjčar won the 1981–82 Yugoslav First League, the first one for the club in 24 years, and two Yugoslav Cups in 1980 and 1983. He then transferred to Austrian club Rapid Wien for which he played until 1990. With the club he won the Austrian Championship twice and even made it to the Cup Winners’ Cup final in 1985. The last club in his playing career was VSE St. Pölten for which he played for two months in late 1990.

=== International ===
Kranjčar made his debut for Yugoslavia in a January 1977 friendly match away against Colombia, coming on as a 60th-minute substitute for Vladimir Petrović, and earned a total of 11 caps, scoring 3 goals. His final international was a November 1983 friendly against France.

He was also capped twice and scored one goal for the Croatia national team and is notable as the first team captain of the Croatian team in their first international match against the United States on 17 October 1990 in Zagreb. Both games were unofficial however, since Croatia was still part of Yugoslavia at the time.

== Managerial career ==
=== Early years ===
Kranjčar started his coaching career in 1991 as an advisor at Austria Klagenfurt. From 1992 until 1994 he coached Croatian club Segesta and in 1994 he transferred to Croatia Zagreb, where he won the Croatian Championship and Cup in his first season. In 1996 he returned to Austria to coach FC Linz. A year later he was back in Croatia where he coached the clubs Slaven Belupo, Segesta (again) and Samobor. In 1998 he came back to Croatia Zagreb and led the club to another win in both the Croatian Championship and Cup as well as to an appearance in the UEFA Champions League. In 1999 he started to coach Egyptian club Al-Masry and in 2000 he went on to coach Slovenian club NK Mura, where he also stayed for one season. In 2002, he became the Croatian championship winner with NK Zagreb.

=== Croatia ===
After Croatia failed to advance through the group stage at the UEFA Euro 2004, Kranjčar was chosen to replace Otto Barić as the national team's coach for the next two years. He went on to lead Croatia in a total of 25 international matches between August 2004 and June 2006. Under his guidance, the team finished top of their group in the 2006 FIFA World Cup qualifying, staying undefeated by recording seven wins and three draws in their ten qualifying matches. At the 2006 FIFA World Cup finals, however, they failed to reach the knock-out stages after losing once and drawing twice in their three group matches. Due to this, the Croatian Football Federation decided not to renew Kranjčar's expiring contract on 14 July 2006.

In June 2007, Kranjčar took over a coaching position with the United Arab Emirates team Al-Shaab, but was sacked in December after a dispute with the board about player selection. On 22 April 2009, he was named as the new head coach of DAC 1904 Dunajská Streda.

=== Persepolis ===
On 1 July 2009, he was appointed head coach of Iran Pro League side Persepolis after he signed a two-year contract. Despite having good players such as Karim Bagheri, Misagh Memarzadeh, Sepehr Heidari, Shpejtim Arifi and Sheys Rezaei, Persepolis was unsuccessful in the first weeks of the season. He was sacked by the club chairman Habib Kashani on 25 September 2009 after his loss against Paykan but he was returned to the club after the support of the technical committee five days later.

His contract was renewed until the end of half season. He was replaced by Ali Daei on 28 December 2009 after his contract expired.

=== Montenegro ===
In February 2010 he took over the Montenegro national team from Zoran Filipović, having a very poor start with two defeats in two friendly matches against Macedonia away and Albania at home and third defeat against Norway with which Filipović had a stunning 3–1 home victory. He was dismissed on 8 September 2011, following Montenegro's defeat to Wales in a UEFA Euro 2012 qualifier six days earlier. The Montenegro Football Federation said he was sacked due to alcohol addiction.

=== Sepahan ===
Kranjčar signed a two-year contract with Iran Pro League three-time champion, Sepahan on 28 October 2011 replacing his compatriot Luka Bonačić. In his first match as Sepahan head coach, Sepahan had a 0–0 draw with Persepolis which Kranjčar coached in 2009.

On 11 May 2012, Sepahan clinched the title for the fourth time (three in a row) and first under Kranjčar with a draw against Mes Sarcheshmeh. They also defeated Esteghlal in the Round of 16 of the ACL and reached the Quarter-finals.

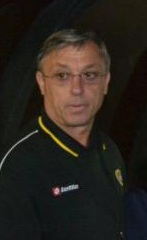
Kranjčar in pre-season with Sepahan in Kish Island

Kranjčar's side faced Foolad in the Round of 32 of the Hazfi Cup on 13 December 2012 which defeated them 2–1 at Isfahan. They defeated Mes Rafsanjan, Sanat Naft and Esteghlal in next matches to reach the final. In final, his side won against Persepolis 4–2 on penalties to crown their 4th domestic cup title in last ten years. In his second season as Sepahan head coach, his side finished in third place, three points behind winner, Esteghlal.

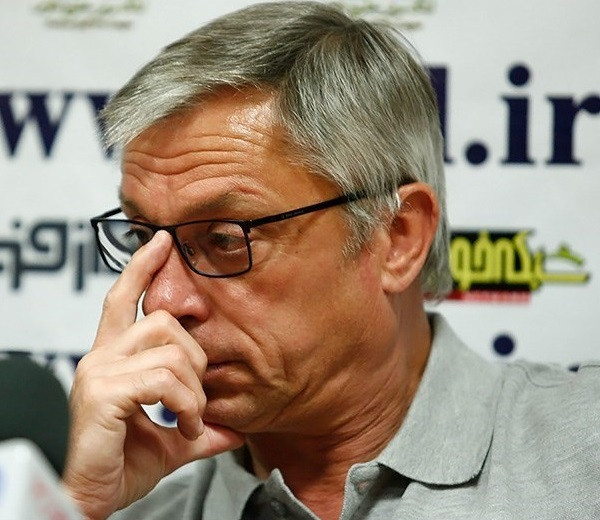
Kranjčar at a press conference before a Hazfi Cup match in 2013

On 8 September 2014, Kranjčar resigned as Sepahan manager for an unannounced reason. He was replaced by Hossein Faraki.

=== Al-Ahli ===
On 7 February 2015, Kranjčar was named as the new manager of Doha-based club Al-Ahli, signing a two-year contract. He was sacked in February 2016 after a run of poor results.

=== Return to Sepahan ===
On 17 March 2017, Kranjčar returned to Iranian club Sepahan signing a two-year contract. However, on 20 January 2018 after a series of bad results, Kranjčar parted ways with them by mutual consent to leave Isfahan.

=== Iran U23 ===
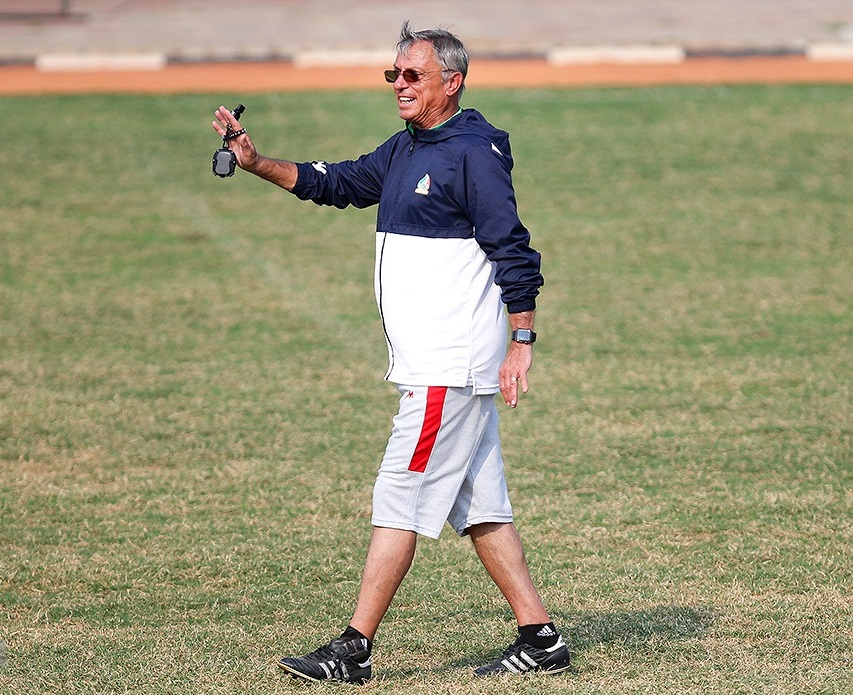
Kranjčar at Iran under-23 training session before a 2018 Asian Games match

On 29 April 2018, Kranjčar became the head coach of the Iran national under-23 team, signing a contract until 2020.

== Personal life ==
Kranjčar was married in 1983 and had a son, Niko, who is also a professional footballer. He was fluent in German.

On 1 March 2021, Kranjčar died at the age of 64 after a short but severe illness. His health deteriorated in Zadar, where he ended up in hospital. He was urgently transferred to Zagreb but doctors were unable to save his life.

== Career statistics ==
=== Club ===
Appearances and goals by club, season and competition
| Club | Season | League | | | Cup | | Europe | | Other | | Total | |
| Club | Season | Division | Apps | Goals | Apps | Goals | Apps | Goals | Apps | Goals | Apps | Goals |
|---|---|---|---|---|---|---|---|---|---|---|---|---|
| Dinamo Zagreb | 1973–74 | Yugoslav First League | 12 | 2 | 0 | 0 | – | | – | | 12 | 2 |
| Dinamo Zagreb | 1974–75 | Yugoslav First League | 30 | 8 | 3 | 0 | – | | – | | 33 | 8 |
| Dinamo Zagreb | 1975–76 | Yugoslav First League | 31 | 6 | 5 | 3 | – | | – | | 36 | 9 |
| Dinamo Zagreb | 1976–77 | Yugoslav First League | 32 | 9 | 1 | 0 | 10 | 6 | – | | 43 | 15 |
| Dinamo Zagreb | 1977–78 | Yugoslav First League | 18 | 9 | 2 | 0 | – | | – | | 20 | 9 |
| Dinamo Zagreb | 1978–79 | Yugoslav First League | 26 | 13 | 0 | 0 | – | | – | | 26 | 13 |
| Dinamo Zagreb | 1979–80 | Yugoslav First League | 32 | 14 | 6 | 5 | 2 | 0 | – | | 40 | 19 |
| Dinamo Zagreb | 1980–81 | Yugoslav First League | 17 | 5 | 2 | 0 | 2 | 0 | – | | 21 | 5 |
| Dinamo Zagreb | 1981–82 | Yugoslav First League | 17 | 12 | 3 | 2 | 0 | 0 | – | | 20 | 14 |
| Dinamo Zagreb | 1982–83 | Yugoslav First League | 29 | 13 | 4 | 9 | 2 | 0 | – | | 35 | 22 |
| Dinamo Zagreb | 1983–84 | Yugoslav First League | 17 | 7 | 2 | 0 | 2 | 2 | – | | 21 | 9 |
| Dinamo Zagreb | Total | | 261 | 98 | 28 | 19 | 18 | 8 | 0 | 0 | 307 | 125 |
| Rapid Wien | 1983–84 | Austrian Bundesliga | 13 | 6 | 6 | 2 | 2 | 1 | – | | 21 | 9 |
| Rapid Wien | 1984–85 | Austrian Bundesliga | 30 | 17 | 7 | 3 | 9 | 1 | – | | 46 | 21 |
| Rapid Wien | 1985–86 | Austrian Bundesliga | 34 | 23 | 5 | 2 | 6 | 1 | – | | 45 | 26 |
| Rapid Wien | 1986–87 | Austrian Bundesliga | 28 | 18 | 7 | 1 | 3 | 2 | 1 (Note: Appearance in Austrian Supercup) | 1 | 39 | 22 |
| Rapid Wien | 1987–88 | Austrian Bundesliga | 31 | 17 | 2 | 0 | 4 | 3 | 1 | 0 | 38 | 20 |
| Rapid Wien | 1988–89 | Austrian Bundesliga | 33 | 17 | 1 | 3 | 2 | 1 | 1 | 0 | 37 | 21 |
| Rapid Wien | 1989–90 | Austrian Bundesliga | 27 | 8 | 4 | 3 | 6 | 2 | – | | 37 | 13 |
| Rapid Wien | 1990–91 | Austrian Bundesliga | 5 | 0 | 1 | 0 | 0 | 0 | – | | 6 | 0 |
| Rapid Wien | Total | | 201 | 106 | 33 | 14 | 32 | 11 | 3 | 1 | 269 | 132 |
| Pölten | 1990–91 | Austrian Bundesliga | 12 | 2 | – | | – | | – | | 12 | 2 |
| Career total | | | 467 | 204 | 62 | 33 | 50 | 19 | 3 | 1 | 582 | 257 |

=== International ===
Appearances and goals by national team and year
| National team | Year | Apps | Goals |
|---|---|---|---|
| Yugoslavia | 1977 | 2 | 0 |
| Yugoslavia | 1978 | 1 | 0 |
| Yugoslavia | 1979 | 1 | 2 |
| Yugoslavia | 1980 | 1 | 0 |
| Yugoslavia | 1981 | 0 | 0 |
| Yugoslavia | 1982 | 1 | 1 |
| Yugoslavia | 1983 | 5 | 0 |
| Total | | 11 | 3 |
| Croatia | 1990 | 2 | 1 |
| Total | | 2 | 1 |

==== International goals ====
Scores and results list Yugoslavia's and Croatia's goal tally first.

| No. | Date | Venue | Cap | Opponent | Score | Result | Competition |
Yugoslavia goals
| 1 | 14 November 1979 | Gradski stadion, Novi Sad, Yugoslavia | 4 | Cyprus | 1–0 | 5–0 | UEFA Euro 1980 qualifying |
| 2 | 14 November 1979 | Gradski stadion, Novi Sad, Yugoslavia | 4 | Cyprus | 2–0 | 5–0 | UEFA Euro 1980 qualifying |
| 3 | 15 December 1982 | Gradski stadion, Titograd, Yugoslavia | 6 | Wales | 3–1 | 4–4 | UEFA Euro 1984 qualifying |
Croatia goals
| 1 | 22 December 1990 | Stadion Kantrida, Rijeka, Yugoslavia | 2 | Romania | 1–0 | 2–0 | Friendly |

== Managerial statistics ==
As of 21 January 2019

| Team | From | To | Record | | | | | | | |
| Team | From | To | G | W | D | L | GF | GA | ± | Win % |
|---|---|---|---|---|---|---|---|---|---|---|
| Segesta | July 1992 | May 1994 | 64 | 22 | 15 | 27 | 79 | 88 | −9 | 34.38 |
| Croatia Zagreb | 27 October 1994 | 5 June 1996 | 70 | 48 | 12 | 10 | 170 | 59 | +111 | 68.57 |
| Samobor | May 1997 | January 1998 | 10 | 9 | 1 | 0 | 26 | 8 | +18 | 90.00 |
| Croatia Zagreb | 16 February 1998 | 24 October 1998 | 35 | 23 | 7 | 5 | 73 | 31 | +42 | 65.71 |
| El-Masry | February 1999 | August 2000 | 30 | 20 | 5 | 5 | 44 | 10 | +34 | 66.67 |
| Marsonia | November 2000 | March 2001 | 9 | 3 | 2 | 4 | 17 | 18 | −1 | 33.33 |
| Zagreb | April 2001 | May 2002 | 41 | 21 | 9 | 11 | 83 | 49 | +34 | 51.22 |
| Rijeka | June 2002 | December 2002 | 22 | 5 | 3 | 14 | 23 | 33 | −10 | 22.73 |
| Zagreb | June 2003 | February 2004 | 12 | 3 | 3 | 6 | 11 | 15 | −4 | 25.00 |
| Croatia | July 2004 | August 2006 | 25 | 11 | 8 | 6 | 29 | 15 | +14 | 44.00 |
| Persepolis | July 2009 | December 2009 | 21 | 8 | 9 | 4 | 31 | 24 | +7 | 38.10 |
| Montenegro | February 2010 | September 2011 | 12 | 6 | 2 | 4 | 14 | 11 | +3 | 50.00 |
| Sepahan | October 2011 | September 2014 | 120 | 62 | 34 | 24 | 181 | 108 | +73 | 51.67 |
| Al-Ahli | February 2015 | February 2016 | 36 | 17 | 11 | 8 | 55 | 37 | +18 | 47.22 |
| Dinamo Zagreb | July 2016 | September 2016 | 16 | 11 | 2 | 3 | 28 | 18 | +10 | 68.75 |
| Sepahan | March 2017 | January 2018 | 27 | 8 | 9 | 10 | 30 | 29 | +1 | 29.63 |
| Iran U23 | April 2018 | May 2019 | 18 | 9 | 3 | 6 | 30 | 18 | +12 | 50.00 |
| Total | | | 568 | 286 | 135 | 147 | 924 | 571 | +353 | 50.35 |

Source: hrnogomet.com

== Honours ==
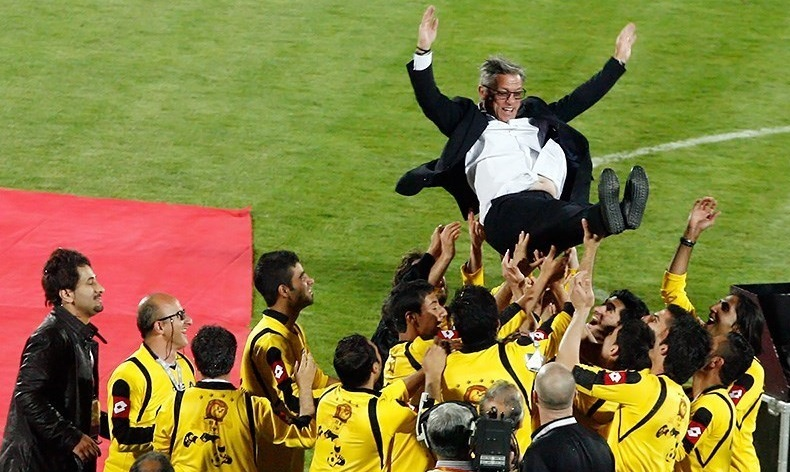
Kranjčar after winning Hazfi Cup in 2013 with Sepahan

=== Player ===
Dinamo Zagreb

- Yugoslav First League: 1981–82
- Yugoslav Cup: 1980, 1983
- Yugoslav Youth Cup: 1973

Rapid Wien

- Austrian Bundesliga: 1986–87, 1987–88
- Austrian Cup: 1984, 1985, 1987
- Austrian Supercup: 1986, 1987, 1988

Individual

- Dinamo Zagreb all time XI

=== Manager ===
Dinamo Zagreb

- Croatian First League: 1995–96, 1997–98
- Croatian Cup: 1996, 1998

NK Zagreb

- Croatian First League: 2001–02

Sepahan

- Iran Pro League: 2011–12
- Hazfi Cup: 2012–13

=== Individual ===
- Franjo Bučar State Award for Sport: 2005
- Iranian Manager of the Year: 2012
- Iran Football Federation Award Coach of the Season: 2012–13

Awards and achievements
| Preceded by Amir Ghalenoei | Iran Pro League Winning Manager; 2011–12 | Succeeded by Amir Ghalenoei |

Sporting positions
| Preceded by Otto Barić | Croatia national football team manager 2004–2006 | Succeeded by Slaven Bilić |
