= Martin Puza =

Austrian footballer

Personal information
- Date of birth: 23 January 1970 (age 56)
- Position: Defender

Senior career*
Years	Team	Apps	(Gls)
1988–1990	Rapid Wien	8	(0)
1990–1991	LASK		
1991–1993	Rapid Wien	39	(0)
1993–1996	Grazer AK		
- * Club domestic league appearances and goals

Martin Puza (born 23 January 1970) is an Austrian former footballer.
