= Peter Wurz =

Austrian footballer

Personal information
- Date of birth: 29 August 1967 (age 59)
- Place of birth: Austria
- Position: Forward

Senior career*
Years	Team	Apps	(Gls)
- Favoritner AC
–1988	Rapid Wien	6	(4)
1988	Espanyol	6	(0)
1989–1991	Rapid Wien	19	(4)
1991–1995	Admira Wacker Mödling	65+	(4+)
1995	Wiener Sport-Club		
1995–1996	Admira Wacker Mödling		
1996–1998	Wiener Neustadt		
1998–1999	Himberg		
1999–2001	Ostbahn XI		
2001–2003	ASV Baden		
- * Club domestic league appearances and goals

Peter Wurz (born 29 August 1967 in Austria) is an Austrian former footballer.
