= Herbert Gager =

Austrian footballer

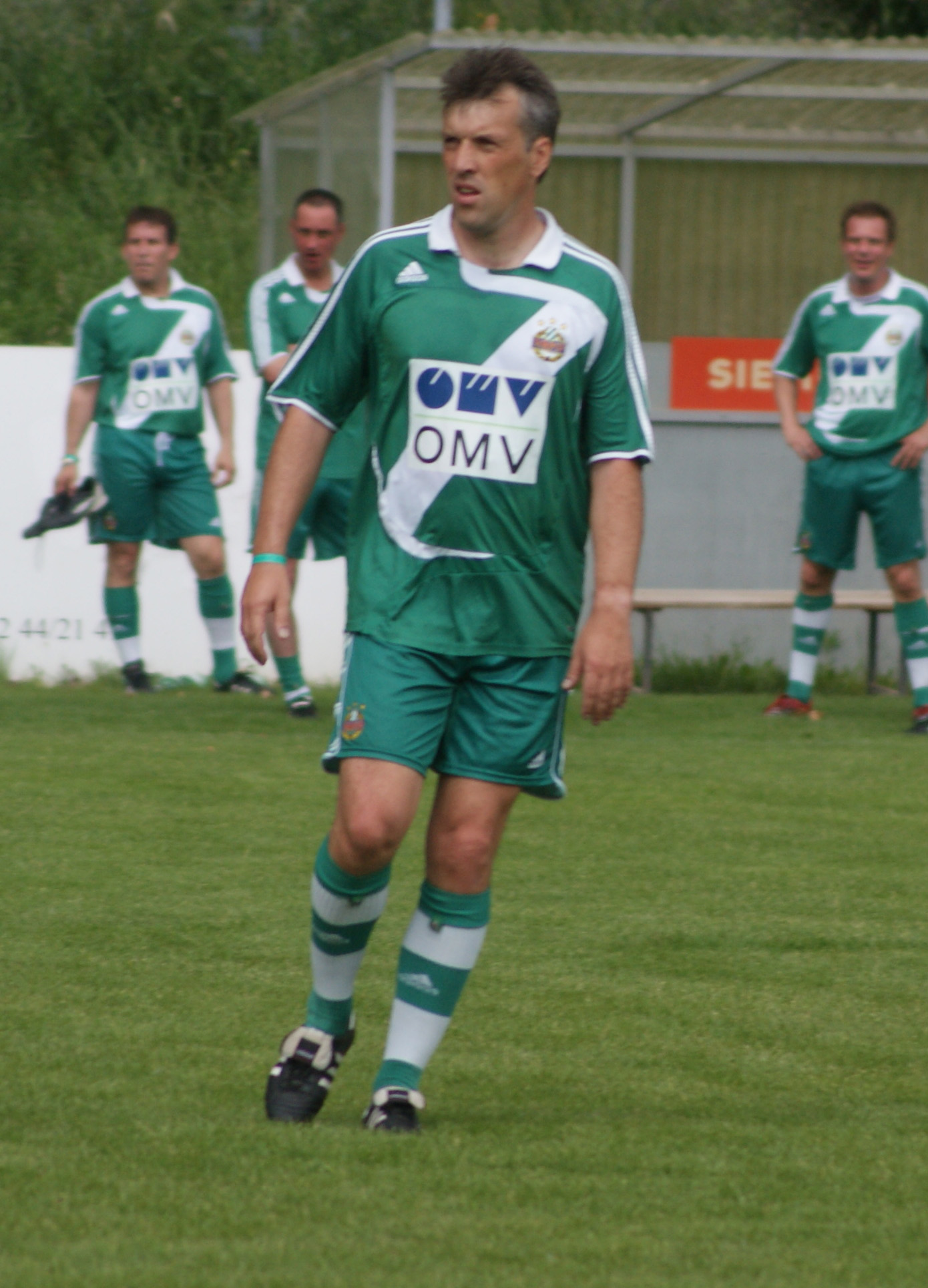

Personal information
- Date of birth: 18 September 1969 (age 57)
- Place of birth: Vienna, Austria
- Height: 1.83 m (6 ft 0 in)
- Position: Defender

Senior career*
Years	Team	Apps	(Gls)
1988–1989	Rapid Wien	14	(0)
1990–1991	Wiener SC	21	(2)
1991–1992	Rapid Wien	35	(4)
1992–1993	Stahl Linz	23	(3)
1993–1994	Vfb Mödling	20	(3)
1994–1996	Admira/Wacker Wien	81	(12)
1996–1998	Austria Wien	68	(14)
1998–1999	Schwarz-Weiß Bregenz	45	(11)
2000	Untersiebenbrunn		
2000–2002	Skoda Xanthi	41	(3)

International career
1991–1992	Austria	4	(0)

Managerial career
- 2011–2014: Austria Wien II
- 2014: Austria Wien
- 2014: St. Pölten
- 2015: Pilgersdorf
- 2016-2018: Mannsdorf
- 2019-: Team Wiener Linien Elektra
- * Club domestic league appearances and goals

Herbert Gager (born 18 September 1969) is a retired Austrian international footballer who played as a defender for clubs in Austria and Greece. He is now head coach of TWL Elektra in the Regionalliga Ost (3rd level).

== Club career ==
Born in Vienna, Gager began playing professional football for SK Rapid Wien in the Austrian Football Bundesliga.

In July 2000, Gager moved to Greece where he would spend two seasons with Skoda Xanthi playing the Super League Greece and UEFA Cup. At age 32, he left Xanthi and returned to Austria to play for amateur side Hollabrunn.

== International career ==
Gager made four appearances for Austria from 1991 to 1992.

== Coaching career ==
Gager became head coach of Austria Wien for the remainder of the 2013–14 season after Nenad Bjelica was sacked on 16 February 2014. He had been head coach of the reserve team since 22 December 2011. Gager was sacked on 12 May 2014. He had lost to Sturm Graz 2–1 the day before and was subsequently knocked–out of third–place which would have given them a 2014–15 UEFA Europa League spot. He then became head coach of St. Pölten from 4 June 2014 until he was sacked on 7 October 2014. He had lost 10 of his 19 competitive matches.

== Coaching record ==
As of 14 October 2014

Team	From	To	Record								
Team	From	To	G	W	D	L	GF	GA	GD	Win %	Ref.
Austria Wien II	22 December 2011	16 February 2014	60	35	15	10	118	71	+47	58.33	
Austria Wien	16 February 2014	17 May 2014	13	6	4	3	19	11	+8	46.15	
St. Pölten	4 June 2014	7 October 2014	19	6	3	10	26	24	+2	31.58	
Total			92	47	22	23	163	106	+57	51.09	—
