= Franz Blizenec =

Austrian footballer

Personal information
- Date of birth: 30 October 1966 (age 60)
- Position: Midfielder

Senior career*
Years	Team	Apps	(Gls)
1987–1994	Rapid Wien	117	(3)
1991–1992	Kremser SC		
1994–1996	Grazer AK		
1996–1997	Vienna		
- * Club domestic league appearances and goals

Franz Blizenec (born 30 October 1966) is an Austrian former footballer.
