= Peter Schöttel =

Austrian footballer and manager

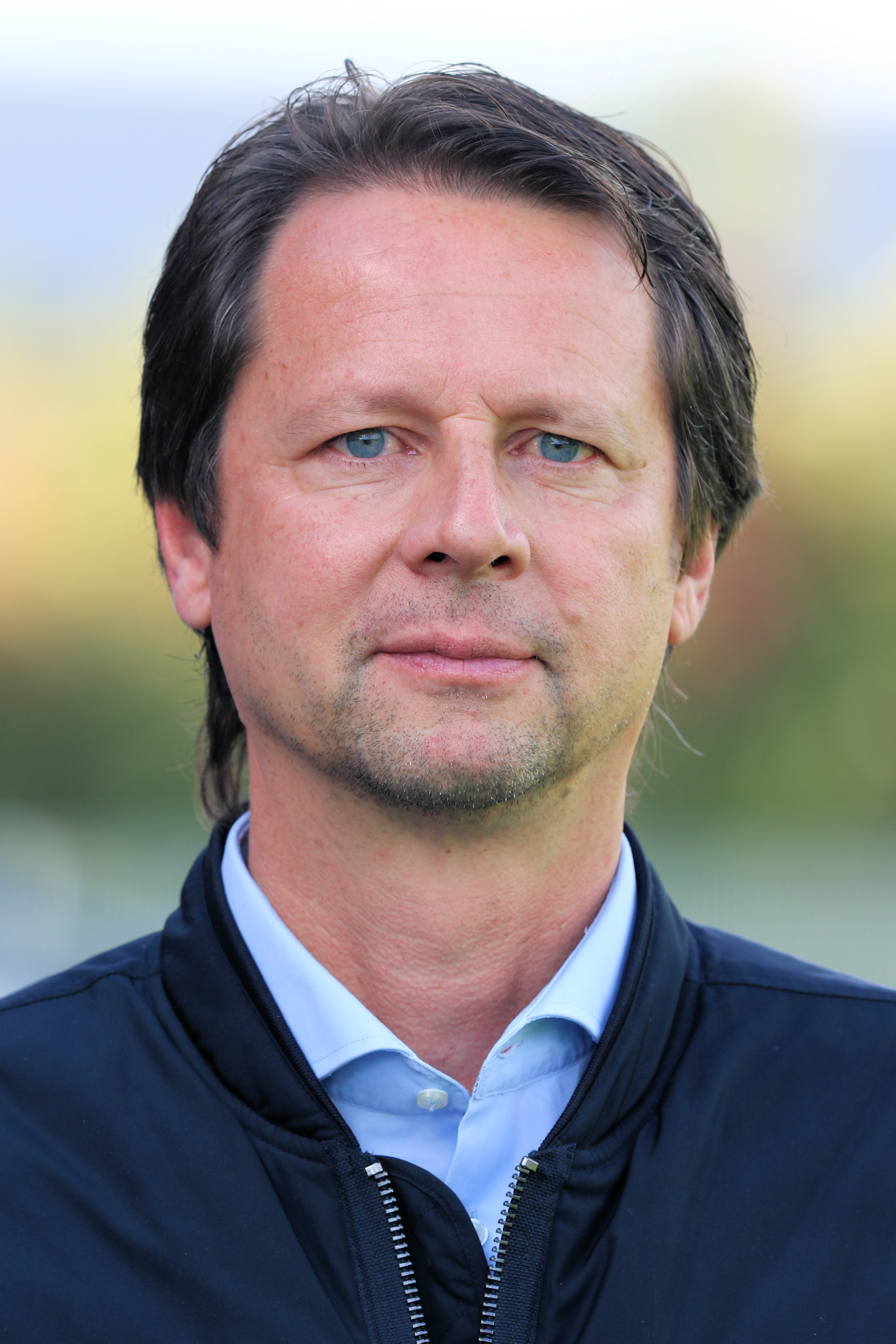
- Schöttel in 2019

Personal information
- Full name: Peter Schöttel
- Date of birth: 26 March 1967 (age 59)
- Place of birth: Vienna, Austria
- Height: 1.91 m (6 ft 3 in)
- Position: Defender

Youth career
- Rapid Wien

Senior career*
Years	Team	Apps	(Gls)
1986–2002	Rapid Wien	436	(4)

International career
1988–2002	Austria	63	(0)

Managerial career
- 2001–2002: Rapid Wien II
- 2007–2008: Wiener Sport-Club
- 2009–2011: SC Wiener Neustadt
- 2011–2013: Rapid Wien
- 2015–2016: SV Grödig
- 2017: Austria U19
- 2017–: Austria (sporting director)
- * Club domestic league appearances and goals

Peter Schöttel (born 26 March 1967) is a retired Austrian footballer and manager. He currently works as a pundit for Sky Austria.

== Club career ==
In his playing career Schöttel played exclusively for Rapid Vienna, making him a cult hero with Rapid fans. He was also Rapid's captain between 1997 and 2001. He won league and domestic cup titles with Rapid and played the full 90 minutes of the 1996 UEFA Cup Winners Cup Final against Paris St Germain in Brussels, which Rapid lost. In 1999, he was chosen as a member of Rapid's Team of the Century.

After finishing his playing career, he began working as a coach for the Rapid amateurs, continuing his association with the club until 2006. On 11 November 2006, after sustaining criticism for negotiating TV punditry contracts while allowing his duties at Rapid to wane, he left the club. In the summer of 2007, he began work as a trainer with Wiener Sportclub with his contract running until the end of June 2008.

His squad number, 5, was retired by Rapid Wien until the 2011 season as a mark of respect for Schöttel's playing career.

== International career ==
Schöttel made his international debut for Austria in a February 1988 friendly match against Switzerland and was a participant at the 1990 FIFA World Cup and 1998 FIFA World Cup. He earned 62 caps but scored no goals. His final international match was the embarrassing 0–9 demolition by Spain in a European Championship qualifying match in March 1999. In 2002, he just played for four minutes in a friendly match against Norway for his official retirement.

== Coaching career ==
In December 2009, Schöttel was appointed as manager to the Austrian Bundesliga club SC Wiener Neustadt. In 2011, he became manager of Rapid Wien. He was sacked on 17 April 2013. Schöttel was hired as Grödig head coach.

== Coaching statistics ==
As of 9 May 2012

Team	From	To	Record				
Team	From	To	G	W	D	L	Win %
Rapid Wien II	1 July 2001	31 December 2002					
Wiener Sport-Club	1 July 2007	30 June 2008					
SC Wiener Neustadt	14 December 2009	31 May 2011					
Rapid Wien	1 June 2011	17 April 2013.	40	19	14	7	47.50
Total			40	19	14	7	47.50

== Honours ==
=== Player ===
Rapid Wien

- Austrian Bundesliga: 1986–87, 1987–88, 1995–96
- Austrian Cup: 1986–87, 1994–95
