= Robert Pecl =

Austrian footballer

Personal information
- Full name: Robert Pecl
- Date of birth: 15 November 1965 (age 60)
- Place of birth: Vienna, Austria
- Height: 1.89 m (6 ft 2 1/2 in)
- Position: Defender

Senior career*
Years	Team	Apps	(Gls)
1986–1995	Rapid Wien	189	(15)

International career
1987–1993	Austria	31	(1)
- * Club domestic league appearances and goals

Robert Pecl (born 15 November 1965) is an Austrian retired footballer

== Club career ==
Between 1986 and 1995 he played club football for Rapid Wien and he captained the team in his final three seasons at the club. He had to end his career prematurely because of injury.

== International career ==
He made his debut for Austria in October 1987 against Spain and was a participant at the 1990 FIFA World Cup, playing in all three games. He earned 31 caps, scoring one goal. His last international was a May 1993 World Cup qualification match against Sweden.
