= 1987–88 Austrian Football Bundesliga =

70th season of top-tier football league in Austria

Austrian Bundesliga
- Season: 1987–88
- Champions: SK Rapid Wien

Statistics of Austrian Football Bundesliga in the 1987–88 season.

== Overview ==
Fall season is performed in 12 teams, and higher eight teams go into Meister playoff. Lower four teams fought in Mittlere Playoff with higher four teams of Austrian Football First League.

SK Rapid Wien won the championship.

=== Teams and location ===
Location of teams in the 1987–88 Austrian Football Bundesliga

Teams of 1987–88 Austrian Football Bundesliga

- FC Admira/Wacker
- Austria Wien
- First Vienna
- Grazer AK
- Kärnten
- LASK
- VfB Mödling
- Rapid Wien
- Swarovski Tirol
- Sturm Graz
- VÖEST Linz
- Wiener Sport-Club

== Autumn season ==
=== Table ===
Pos	Team	Pld	W	D	L	GF	GA	GD	Pts
1	Rapid Wien	22	15	6	1	52	22	+30	36
2	Austria Wien	22	11	6	5	47	27	+20	28
3	Grazer AK	22	10	7	5	32	29	+3	27
4	Admira/Wacker	22	11	3	8	52	31	+21	25
5	Swarovski Tirol	22	8	9	5	34	30	+4	25
6	Sturm Graz	22	9	6	7	33	32	+1	24
7	First Vienna	22	11	1	10	45	40	+5	23
8	Wiener SC	22	6	10	6	39	46	−7	22
9	VOEST Linz	22	7	5	10	37	40	−3	19
10	Linzer ASK	22	4	5	13	21	44	−23	13
11	Austria Klagenfurt	22	4	4	14	17	43	−26	12
12	VfB Mödling	22	2	6	14	29	54	−25	10

Source: rsssf.com

=== Results ===
Home \ Away	ADM	KLA	AWI	FIR	GAK	LIN	RWI	STU	SWA	VOE	MÖD	WIE
Admira/Wacker		6–2	3–1	2–0	3–0	2–0	1–2	0–1	3–1	2–0	3–3	6–2
Austria Klagenfurt	0–0		0–0	0–5	2–3	2–1	1–1	0–1	3–1	2–1	2–1	1–3
Austria Wien	3–2	2–1		7–0	0–2	2–0	1–2	2–0	3–0	5–2	0–0	5–1
First Vienna	2–4	3–0	1–1		2–1	3–2	1–2	0–1	3–1	0–3	3–1	2–0
Grazer AK	1–0	2–0	1–1	0–4		2–1	1–1	3–0	2–0	3–1	1–0	2–2
Linzer ASK	0–4	0–0	2–1	0–4	2–1		1–3	1–3	0–2	2–1	1–1	1–1
Rapid Wien	3–2	3–0	1–2	3–1	4–0	3–1		2–0	0–0	2–1	5–1	3–3
Sturm Graz	3–1	4–0	3–4	2–1	1–1	1–3	0–2		2–2	2–2	1–0	2–2
Swarovski Tirol	1–1	1–0	1–0	4–1	2–2	0–0	3–3	3–0		3–1	2–1	1–1
VOEST Linz	1–0	1–0	1–3	3–1	1–1	1–1	1–1	0–3	1–1		3–2	4–1
VfB Mödling	2–5	2–1	3–3	2–3	1–2	3–2	0–3	2–2	1–3	1–6		1–1
Wiener SC	3–2	2–0	1–1	1–5	1–1	4–0	1–3	1–1	2–2	4–2	2–1	

Legend: Blue = home team win; Yellow = draw; Red = away team win.

== Spring season ==
=== Championship playoff ===
==== Table ====
Pos	Team	Pld	W	D	L	GF	GA	GD	Pts
1	Rapid Wien	36	22	10	4	81	40	+41	54
2	Austria Wien	36	19	8	9	83	47	+36	46
3	Sturm Graz	36	15	12	9	55	48	+7	42
4	First Vienna	36	18	3	15	68	65	+3	39
5	Admira/Wacker	36	16	6	14	73	51	+22	38
6	Swarovski Tirol	36	11	15	10	47	49	−2	37
7	Grazer AK	36	11	13	12	50	66	−16	35
8	Wiener SC	36	9	13	14	63	77	−14	31

Source: rsssf.com

==== Results ====
Home \ Away	ADM	AWI	FIR	GAK	RWI	STU	SWA	WIE
Admira/Wacker		3–1	4–2	2–0	1–2	0–0	1–1	1–0
Austria Wien	2–2		1–2	5–1	4–2	5–1	1–1	2–0
First Vienna	2–0	2–0		2–1	1–3	1–4	3–0	3–0
Grazer AK	4–1	1–2	2–2		0–0	1–1	1–1	2–2
Rapid Wien	2–1	2–4	3–1	6–1		1–1	4–2	3–0
Sturm Graz	2–0	0–2	1–1	5–2	2–1		2–0	1–1
Swarovski Tirol	1–0	2–1	0–1	0–0	0–0	0–0		2–0
Wiener SC	1–4	1–6	5–0	8–2	0–0	1–2	5–3	

Legend: Blue = home team win; Yellow = draw; Red = away team win.

=== Promotion/relegation playoff ===
==== Table ====
Pos	Team	Pld	W	D	L	GF	GA	GD	Pts
1	Linzer ASK	14	4	10	0	16	7	+9	18
2	Austria Klagenfurt	14	6	6	2	18	12	+6	18
3	VSE St. Pölten (Note: Belongs to Austrian Football First League)	14	6	5	3	30	17	+13	17
4	Vorwärts Steyr	14	5	7	2	14	8	+6	17
5	VOEST Linz	14	5	5	4	17	18	−1	15
6	Kremser SC	14	4	4	6	14	16	−2	12
7	Austria Salzburg	14	4	1	9	10	20	−10	9
8	VfB Mödling	14	2	2	10	14	35	−21	6

Source: rsssf.com

==== Results ====
Home \ Away	KLA	ASZ	KRE	LIN	VOE	MÖD	VOR	StP
Austria Klagenfurt		2–0	2–0	1–1	3–0	4–0	1–0	2–2
Austria Salzburg	0–1		2–1	0–2	1–3	2–1	0–2	2–0
Kremser SC	2–0	2–0		0–0	3–1	4–1	0–0	1–1
Linzer ASK	0–0	1–1	2–0		1–1	2–1	0–0	0–0
VOEST Linz	2–2	2–0	0–0	1–1		2–1	0–2	3–0
VfB Mödling	0–0	0–2	3–2	1–5	0–1		0–0	2–1
Vorwärts Steyr	0–0	1–0	2–0	0–0	1–1	3–1		2–4
VSE St. Pölten	5–0	2–0	2–0	1–1	3–0	8–3	1–1	

Legend: Blue = home team win; Yellow = draw; Red = away team win.
