= 1982–83 SK Rapid Wien season =

Rapid Wien
1982–83 season
- Coach: Otto Baric
- Stadium: Gerhard-Hanappi-Stadion, Vienna, Austria
- Bundesliga: Champions (27th title)
- Cup: Winners (10th title)
- European Cup: Round of 16
- Top goalscorer: League: Hans Krankl (23); All: Hans Krankl (36)
- Average home league attendance: 7,500

The 1982–83 SK Rapid Wien season was the 85th season in club history.

== Squad ==
=== Squad statistics ===
No.	Nat.	Name	Age	League		Cup		European Cup		Total		Discipline	
No.	Nat.	Name	Age	Apps	Goals	Apps	Goals	Apps	Goals	Apps	Goals	Booked	Sent off (straight red)
Goalkeepers
1	(Austria)	Karl Ehn	28	0+1						0+1			
1	(Austria)	Herbert Feurer	28	30		7		4		41			
Defenders
2	(Austria)	Bernd Krauss	25	30	3	7	1	3		40	4	2	
3	(Austria)	Kurt Garger	21	22+5		5		4	1	31+5	1	1	
4	(Austria)	Johann Pregesbauer	24	27+2		6+1	2	3		36+3	2	2	
5	(Austria)	Heribert Weber	27	30	2	7		4	1	41	3	5	
12	(Austria)	Michael Keller	21	0+1						0+1			
15	(Austria)	Leo Lainer	21	28+1	6	5	1	4	1	37+1	8	4	1
Midfielders
6	(Austria)	Reinhard Kienast	22	21+2	4	7	3	3+1	1	31+3	8	2	1
8	(Czechoslovakia)	Antonín Panenka	31	29	15	6	1	4	2	39	18	4	
10	(Socialist Federal Republic of Yugoslavia)	Petar Brucic	29	21	2	6		2+1		29+1	2	3	1
17	(Soviet Union)	Anatoli Zinchenko	32	6+5		1+1		0+1		7+7			
Forwards
7	(Austria)	Johann Gröss	22	4+2		1	1	1		6+2	1		
9	(Austria)	Hans Krankl	29	26	23	7	9	4	4	37	36	3	
11	(Austria)	Christian Keglevits	21	27+2	7	5+2	2	3+1	3	35+5	12	2	
13	(Austria)	Helmut Hofmann	21	4+10	2	2+2		0+2		6+14	2		
14	(Austria)	Rudolf Weinhofer	20	1+5		0+1		1+1		2+7		2	
16	(Socialist Federal Republic of Yugoslavia)	Vukan Perovic	29	3+6	1	0+4	1			3+10	2	1	
18	(Austria)	Gerald Willfurth	19	21+9	7	5+2	2	4	3	30+11	12	1	

== Fixtures and results ==
Win Draw Loss

=== League ===
Rd	Date	Venue	Opponent	Res.	Att.	Goals and discipline
1	21.08.1982	A	Austria Klagenfurt	3-1	9,000	Panenka 52', Kienast R. 66', Krankl 71'
2	27.08.1982	H	Austria Wien	0-0	20,000	Brucic (red card) 16'
3	04.09.1982	A	VÖEST Linz	3-0	3,500	Willfurth 49' 86', Panenka 65'
4	10.09.1982	H	Wiener SC	5-1	10,500	Krankl 20' 26', Panenka 44' (pen.), Kienast R. 67', Keglevits 80'
5	18.09.1982	A	Admira	0-0	14,000	Kienast R. (red card) 12'
6	25.09.1982	H	Sturm Graz	2-1	8,500	Willfurth 8', Panenka 76'
7	01.10.1982	A	Austria Salzburg	0-0	8,000	
8	09.10.1982	H	Neusiedl/See	4-0	6,500	Krankl 1' 65', Krauss 44', Brucic 66'
9	16.10.1982	A	Wacker Innsbruck	2-2	12,000	Panenka 26', Krankl 50'
10	23.10.1982	A	Simmering	4-1	8,000	Krankl 20' 25' 77' (pen.), Panenka 60'
11	29.10.1982	H	LASK	0-0	6,000	
12	06.11.1982	A	Vienna	3-0	5,600	Lainer 11', Krauss 14', Willfurth 84'
13	13.11.1982	H	GAK	2-0	4,500	Krankl 42', Panenka 56'
14	20.11.1982	A	Union Wels	3-0	11,000	Lainer 15', Krankl 39', Willfurth 76'
15	27.11.1982	H	Eisenstadt	5-1	7,000	Krankl 8' 21', Keglevits 25' 70', Panenka 49'
16	19.03.1983	H	Austria Klagenfurt	2-2	7,500	Keglevits 34', Krankl 90+1'; Lainer (red card) 62'
17	12.05.1983	A	Austria Wien	3-0	28,000	Krankl 49' 60', Panenka 73'
18	02.04.1983	H	VÖEST Linz	4-0	6,000	Kienast R. 4', Keglevits 21', Krankl 85' 88'
19	09.04.1983	A	Wiener SC	4-0	6,500	Krauss 54', Krankl 80' 89', Perovic 82'
20	16.04.1983	H	Admira	2-0	6,000	Brucic 56', Krankl 72' (pen.)
21	23.04.1983	A	Sturm Graz	0-0	11,000	
22	30.04.1983	H	Austria Salzburg	5-2	6,000	Willfurth 4', Kienast R. 22', Krankl 31' 41', Panenka 53'
23	07.05.1983	A	Neusiedl/See	1-2	6,000	Panenka 57'
24	15.05.1983	H	Wacker Innsbruck	1-1	8,000	Keglevits 25'
25	20.05.1983	H	Simmering	3-0	5,000	Panenka 39' 57' 88'
26	28.05.1983	A	LASK	0-3	7,000	
27	03.06.1983	H	Vienna	2-1	5,500	Panenka 4' (pen.), Hofmann H. 61'
28	11.06.1983	A	GAK	4-0	6,000	Lainer 13' 26', Weber H. 41', Keglevits 43'
29	18.06.1983	H	Union Wels	1-0	5,000	Hofmann H. 21'
30	25.06.1983	A	Eisenstadt	4-0	15,000	Willfurth 10', Lainer 12' 68', Weber H. 54'

=== Cup ===
Rd	Date	Venue	Opponent	Res.	Att.	Goals and discipline
R2	31.08.1982	A	Schwechat	4-1	5,000	Kienast R. 10', Krauss 25', Gröss 28', Keglevits 86'
R3	26.10.1982	A	Slovan Wien	2-0	2,500	Krankl 50' 53'
R16	12.03.1983	A	FAC	2-1	4,500	Krankl 11' 17'
QF	22.03.1983	H	LASK	2-0	4,500	Pregesbauer 40', Panenka 77'
SF	29.03.1983	H	Sturm Graz	5-3 (a.e.t.)	4,000	Kienast R. 38', Pregesbauer 58', Perovic 65', Willfurth 91', Krankl 111'
F-L1	19.04.1983	H	Wacker Innsbruck	3-0	13,000	Willfurth 39', Krankl 55', Keglevits 73'
F-L2	03.05.1983	A	Wacker Innsbruck	5-0	9,000	Krankl 15' 25' 32' (pen.), Kienast R. 22', Lainer 53'

=== European Cup ===
Rd	Date	Venue	Opponent	Res.	Att.	Goals and discipline
R1-L1	15.09.1982	A	Avenir Beggen (Luxembourg)	5-0	2,800	Krankl 21' 27' 52', Panenka 39', Willfurth 77'
R1-L2	29.09.1982	H	Avenir Beggen (Luxembourg)	8-0	9,500	Weber H. 9', Krankl 20', Willfurth 21' 54', Keglevits 34' 77', Garger 49', Thill 70' (o.g.)
R2-L1	20.10.1982	H	Widzew Łódź (Poland)	2-1	15,000	Keglevits 57', Kienast R. 71'
R2-L2	03.11.1982	A	Widzew Łódź (Poland)	3-5	18,000	Panenka 32' (pen.), Lainer 52', Grębosz 88' (o.g.)
