= 1984–85 SK Rapid Wien season =

Rapid Wien
1984–85 season
- Coach: Otto Baric
- Stadium: Gerhard-Hanappi-Stadion, Vienna, Austria
- Bundesliga: 2nd
- Cup: Winners (12th title)
- Cup Winners' Cup: Runners-up
- Top goalscorer: League: Zlatko Kranjcar (17); All: Hans Krankl (30)
- Average home league attendance: 5,500

The 1984–85 SK Rapid Wien season was the 87th season in club history.

== Squad ==
=== Squad statistics ===
No.	Nat.	Name	Age	League		Cup		CW Cup		Total		Discipline	
No.	Nat.	Name	Age	Apps	Goals	Apps	Goals	Apps	Goals	Apps	Goals	Booked	Sent off (straight red)
Goalkeepers
1	(Austria)	Karl Ehn	30	4		1				5			
1	(Austria)	Herbert Feurer	30	19		3		6		28			
1	(Austria)	Michael Konsel	22	7		3		3		13			
Defenders
2	(Austria)	Leo Lainer	23	27+1	4	6	2	9	3	42+1	9	4	
3	(Austria)	Kurt Garger	23	25+2	1	6		7+1		38+3	1	5	
4	(Austria)	Johann Pregesbauer	26	16+2		3+1		4		23+3			
5	(Austria)	Heribert Weber	29	26	4	6	2	8		40	6	6	
6	(Austria)	Reinhard Kienast	24	20+1	4	5		5		30+1	4	6	
12	(Austria)	Michael Keller	23	0+1				0+1		0+2			
14	(Austria)	Rudolf Weinhofer	22	7+15		1+1		3+2		11+18		4	1
16	(Austria)	Leopold Rotter	19	1+3				0+1		1+4			
Midfielders
8	(Czechoslovakia)	Antonín Panenka	33	20+1	13	5	1	6+1	5	31+2	19	2	1
10	(Socialist Federal Republic of Yugoslavia)	Petar Brucic	31	24		6		7	1	37	1	8	
13	(Austria)	Peter Hristic	22	8+3	5	1+3		1+2	1	10+8	6		
15	(Austria)	Karl Brauneder	24	25+3	7	5+2		9		39+5	7	4	
18	(Austria)	Gerald Willfurth	21	12+3	2	6	3	4+1		22+4	5	1	
Forwards
7	(Socialist Federal Republic of Yugoslavia)	Zlatko Kranjcar	27	29+1	17	7	3	9	1	45+1	21	3	
9	(Austria)	Hans Krankl	31	25	14	7	12	8	4	40	30	2	
11	(Austria)	Peter Pacult	24	26+1	12	5	3	8+1	4	39+2	19		
17	(Austria)	Hermann Stadler	23	1+5		1+1		0+2		2+8			
19	(Austria)	Johann Gröss	24	8+11	2	0+3		2+1		10+15	2	1	

== Fixtures and results ==
Win Draw Loss

=== League ===
Rd	Date	Venue	Opponent	Res.	Att.	Goals and discipline
1	24.08.1984	A	Vienna	1-0	6,000	Willfurth 68'
2	31.08.1984	H	Leoben	2-1	6,000	Panenka 20' (pen.), Pacult 56'
3	07.09.1984	A	Austria Salzburg	2-0	12,000	Pacult 50', Krankl 62'
4	14.09.1984	A	Eisenstadt	1-1	7,500	Panenka 73' (pen.); Panenka (red card) 75'
5	21.09.1984	H	FavAC	7-0	4,000	Krankl 26' 34' 78', Pacult 42', Panenka 43', Kranjcar 52', Kienast R. 83'
6	29.09.1984	A	Wacker Innsbruck	4-2	15,000	Brauneder 31', Panenka 64', Kranjcar 65', Kienast R. 73'
7	06.10.1984	H	LASK	7-1	8,500	Lainer 17', Kranjcar 22' 23' 59' 73', Panenka 31', Pacult 69'
8	13.10.1984	A	Sturm Graz	1-2	9,000	Kranjcar 64'
9	20.10.1984	H	Admira	3-1	5,500	Panenka 21', Brauneder 31', Weber H. 37'
10	27.10.1984	A	Spittal/Drau	0-1	5,000	
11	03.11.1984	H	Austria Wien	2-2	20,000	Pacult 3', Brauneder 28'
12	21.11.1984	H	Wiener SC	2-0	4,500	Krankl 23' 66'
13	17.11.1984	H	Austria Klagenfurt	2-0	2,500	Krankl 17', Pacult 80'
14	24.11.1984	A	VÖEST Linz	2-2	6,000	Gröss 21', Krankl 59'
15	01.12.1984	H	GAK	2-1	2,500	Kranjcar 17', Brauneder 77'
16	07.12.1984	H	Vienna	5-0	2,000	Kranjcar 1' (pen.) 5', Pacult 69' 77', Weber H. 80'
17	09.03.1985	A	Leoben	1-1	8,000	Panenka 52' (pen.)
18	16.03.1985	H	Austria Salzburg	4-0	4,000	Kienast R. 15' 42', Panenka 20' (pen.), Kranjcar 81'
19	23.03.1985	H	Eisenstadt	1-1	5,000	Krankl 11'
20	30.03.1985	A	FavAC	6-2	5,000	Panenka 2' (pen.), Willfurth 5', Krankl 7' 55' 88', Kranjcar 26'
21	06.04.1985	H	Wacker Innsbruck	1-1	5,500	Panenka 47'
22	12.04.1985	A	LASK	3-0	16,000	Lainer 20', Hristic 25', Kranjcar 45'
23	20.04.1985	H	Sturm Graz	2-2	8,200	Panenka 24', Hristic 55'
24	21.05.1985	A	Admira	4-1	5,000	Panenka 24', Lainer 59' 86', Gröss 90'
25	04.05.1985	H	Spittal/Drau	4-0	3,000	Hristic 5', Kranjcar 10', Krankl 25', Pacult 42'
26	10.05.1985	A	Austria Wien	0-1	10,000	Weinhofer (red card) 76'
27	18.05.1985	A	Wiener SC	5-1	4,000	Kranjcar 3', Brauneder 42' 88', Weber H. 73', Krankl 75'
28	24.05.1985	A	Austria Klagenfurt	1-1	5,500	Brauneder 3'
29	31.05.1985	H	VÖEST Linz	7-2	1,600	Pacult 40' 63', Garger 52', Kranjcar 77' 86', Hristic 81', Weber H. 82'
30	07.06.1985	A	GAK	3-3	3,000	Panenka 39', Pacult 58', Hristic 67'

=== Cup ===
Rd	Date	Venue	Opponent	Res.	Att.	Goals and discipline
R2	14.08.1984	A	Ybbs	6-0	2,500	Panenka 36', Krankl 55' 61' (pen.) 85' (pen.), Weber H. 65' 70'
R3	28.08.1984	A	VfB Mödling	5-0	6,000	Willfurth 30' 33' 63', Pacult 82' 87'
R16	02.03.1985	A	LASK	5-2	4,500	Krankl 3' 53' 75', Kranjcar 70', Nagl 88' (o.g.)
QF	02.04.1985	A	Eisenstadt	1-0	7,000	Pacult 33'
SF-L1	28.05.1985	H	Admira	5-2	4,300	Lainer 24' 84', Krankl 29' 81' (pen.) 87'
SF-L2	04.06.1985	A	Admira	2-2	3,000	Krankl 65' (pen.) 86'
F	13.06.1985	N	Austria Wien	3-3 (6-5 p)	16,000	Kranjcar 79' 91', Krankl 104' (pen.)

=== European Cup ===
Rd	Date	Venue	Opponent	Res.	Att.	Goals and discipline
R1-L1	18.09.1984	H	Besiktas (Turkey)	4-1	10,000	Panenka 14' (pen.) 56' 66' (pen.), Brucic 25'
R1-L2	03.10.1984	A	Besiktas (Turkey)	1-1	30,000	Kranjcar 16'
R2-L1	24.10.1984	H	Celtic (Scotland)	3-1	16,000	Pacult 53', Lainer 66', Krankl 87'
R2-L2	12.12.1984	A	Celtic (Scotland)	1-0	58,000	Pacult 18'
QF-L1	06.03.1985	A	Dynamo Dresden (East Germany)	0-3	36,000	
QF-L2	20.03.1985	H	Dynamo Dresden (East Germany)	5-0	15,000	Pacult 4' 37', Lainer 17', Panenka 69' (pen.), Krankl 78'
SF-L1	10.04.1985	H	Dynamo Moscow (Soviet Union)	3-1	20,000	Lainer 67', Krankl 70' (pen.), Hristic 72'
SF-L2	24.04.1985	A	Dynamo Moscow (Soviet Union)	1-1	53,000	Panenka 4'
F	15.05.1985	N	Everton (England)	1-3	38,500	Krankl 85'
