= 1983–84 SK Rapid Wien season =

Rapid Wien
1983–84 season
- Manager: Otto Baric
- Stadium: Gerhard-Hanappi-Stadion
- Bundesliga: 2nd
- ÖFB-Cup: Winners
- European Cup: Quarter-finals
- Top goalscorer: League: Antonín Panenka (18 goals); All: Hans Krankl (26 goals)
- Average home league attendance: 7,900
- Biggest win: 10–0 v. SC Red Star Penzing (A); 30 August 1983
- Biggest defeat: 3–1 v. Nantes (A); 14 September 1983; 3–1 v. Austria Wien (A); 8 May 1984

The 1983–84 SK Rapid Wien season was the 86th season in the club history.

== Squad ==
=== Squad statistics ===
No.	Nat.	Name	Age	League		Cup		European Cup		Total		Discipline	
No.	Nat.	Name	Age	Apps	Goals	Apps	Goals	Apps	Goals	Apps	Goals	Booked	Sent off (straight red)
Goalkeepers
1	(Austria)	Karl Ehn	29	10		4				14			
1	(Austria)	Herbert Feurer	29	18		4		6		28			
1	(Austria)	Gerhard Winkler	20	1						1			
Defenders
2	(Austria)	Leo Lainer	22	29	3	7	1	6		42	4	4	
3	(Austria)	Kurt Garger	22	24+1	1	7		6		37+1	1	5	
4	(Austria)	Johann Pregesbauer	25	28+1		7		6		41+1		2	
5	(Austria)	Heribert Weber	28	24	3	7		6		37	3	7	
6	(Austria)	Reinhard Kienast	23	25+3	4	6+1	3	5+1		36+5	7	2	
12	(Austria)	Michael Keller	22	0+1		0+2				0+3			
16	(Austria)	Leopold Rotter	18			0+1				0+1			
Midfielders
8	(Czechoslovakia)	Antonín Panenka	32	26	18	8		6	3	40	21	3	
10	(Socialist Federal Republic of Yugoslavia)	Petar Brucic	30	8+1		5		2		15+1		2	
13	(Socialist Federal Republic of Yugoslavia)	Zlatko Kranjcar	26	13	6	6	2	2	1	21	9	2	
14	(Austria)	Rudolf Weinhofer	21	13+11	1	3+4	1	2+2		18+17	2	1	
15	(Austria)	Karl Brauneder	23	15+7	5	2	1	3+1		20+8	6	1	
18	(Austria)	Gerald Willfurth	20	25+3	6	6+2	4	4+2		35+7	10	2	
Forwards
7	(Austria)	Hermann Stadler	22	15+10	2	5	1	0+2		20+12	3	2	
9	(Austria)	Hans Krankl	30	27	17	7	8	6	1	40	26	2	
11	(Austria)	Christian Keglevits	22	11+6	1	3+2		5	1	19+8	2	1	1
19	(Austria)	Max Hagmayr	26	7+7		1+1	1	1+4	2	9+12	3		

== Fixtures and results ==
Win Draw Loss

=== League ===
Rd	Date	Venue	Opponent	Res.	Att.	Goals and discipline
1	19.08.1983	H	Eisenstadt	0-0	6,500	
2	27.08.1983	A	Union Wels	2-2	9,000	Kienast R. 80', Panenka 84'; Keglevits (red card) 58'
3	02.09.1983	H	Austria Klagenfurt	1-0	10,000	Brauneder 2'
4	11.09.1983	A	VÖEST Linz	1-1	3,500	Panenka 43'
5	16.09.1983	H	Wacker Innsbruck	5-1	7,000	Kienast R. 35', Panenka 46' (pen.) 73' 80' (pen.), Lainer 89'
6	24.09.1983	A	Austria Wien	0-0	28,000	
7	01.10.1983	H	Sturm Graz	2-0	9,000	Panenka 66', Krankl 84'
8	08.10.1983	A	Neusiedl/See	5-2	3,500	Willfurth 37', Panenka 46' 77', Stadler 87', Krankl 89'
9	15.10.1983	H	Austria Salzburg	1-2	6,000	Panenka 11'
10	22.10.1983	A	St. Veit	3-1	5,000	Krankl 7', Weber H. 14', Garger 47'
11	29.10.1983	H	LASK	3-1	6,000	Krankl 38' 85', Brauneder 43'
12	05.11.1983	A	FavAC	3-1	6,500	Panenka 2' (pen.) 75' (pen.), Brauneder 70'
13	12.11.1983	H	Wiener SC	2-0	5,000	Krankl 1' 54'
14	19.11.1983	H	Admira	1-1	7,000	Krankl 26'
15	26.11.1983	A	GAK	2-3	3,500	Lainer 7', Panenka 47'
16	04.12.1983	A	Eisenstadt	2-0	5,000	Kienast R. 69', Weber H. 70'
18	17.03.1984	A	Austria Klagenfurt	1-0	9,000	Krankl 39'
19	24.03.1984	H	VÖEST Linz	6-0	6,000	Schill 6' (o.g.), Kranjcar 22', Willfurth 54' 74' 81', Krankl 69'
20	31.03.1984	A	Wacker Innsbruck	0-0	13,000	
21	07.04.1984	H	Austria Wien	4-1	16,000	Panenka 38' (pen.) 76', Lainer 80', Kranjcar 88'
22	14.04.1984	A	Sturm Graz	1-1	10,000	Panenka 52' (pen.)
23	21.04.1984	H	Neusiedl/See	8-0	5,000	Kranjcar 9' 21' 40', Kienast R. 11', Krankl 25' 74', Panenka 60', Willfurth 76'
24	27.04.1984	A	Austria Salzburg	1-0	8,000	Krankl 48'
25	04.05.1984	H	St. Veit	4-0	5,000	Weinhofer 17', Kranjcar 37', Krankl 49' 68'
26	11.05.1984	A	LASK	1-1	22,000	Keglevits 70'
27	18.05.1984	H	FavAC	4-0	5,000	Weber H. 27', Stadler 35', Krankl 49' (pen.), Panenka 63'
28	25.05.1984	A	Wiener SC	3-0	8,000	Brauneder 63' 69', Willfurth 88'
29	29.05.1984	A	Admira	0-0	14,000	
30	01.06.1984	H	GAK	2-0	17,000	Krankl 14', Panenka 55'

=== Cup ===
Rd	Date	Venue	Opponent	Res.	Att.	Goals and discipline
R2	30.08.1983	A	Red Star	10-0	2,500	Kienast R. 24' 62', Krankl 33' 35' 73' 79' 84' 88', Willfurth 64', Brauneder 68'
R3	25.10.1983	H	Admira	4-1	2,500	Lainer 12', Stadler 34', Willfurth 36', Hagmayr 86'
R16	02.03.1984	A	GAK	1-0	2,000	Krankl 4'
QF	13.03.1984	A	Vöcklamarkt	2-0	3,000	Willfurth 65', Kranjcar 85'
SF-L1	03.04.1984	H	Wacker Innsbruck	2-0	3,000	Krankl 58', Willfurth 77'
SF-L2	24.04.1984	A	Wacker Innsbruck	0-1	5,000	
F-L1	08.05.1984	A	Austria Wien	1-3	11,000	Kranjcar 58'
F-L2	15.05.1984	H	Austria Wien	2-0	20,500	Weinhofer 13', Kienast R. 24'

=== European Cup ===
Rd	Date	Venue	Opponent	Res.	Att.	Goals and discipline
R1-L1	14.09.1983	H	Nantes (France)	3-0	16,000	Panenka 17' 38', Hagmayr 50'
R1-L2	28.09.1983	A	Nantes (France)	1-3	25,000	Panenka 39'
R2-L1	19.10.1983	A	Bohemians Prag (Czechoslovakia)	1-2	17,000	Keglevits 45'
R2-L2	02.11.1983	H	Bohemians Prag (Czechoslovakia)	1-0	20,000	Krankl 7'
QF-L1	07.03.1984	H	Dundee United (Scotland)	2-1	18,000	Hagmayr 76', Kranjcar 86'
QF-L2	21.03.1984	A	Dundee United (Scotland)	0-1	22,000	
