= 1981–82 SK Rapid Wien season =

Rapid Wien
1981-82 season
- Coaches: Walter Skocik, Rudolf Nuske
- Stadium: Gerhard-Hanappi-Stadion, Vienna, Austria
- Bundesliga: Champions (26th title)
- Cup: Round of 16
- UEFA Cup: Round of 16
- Top goalscorer: League: Hans Krankl (19); All: Hans Krankl (23)
- Average home league attendance: 8,800

The 1981–82 SK Rapid Wien season was the 84th season in club history.

== Squad ==
=== Squad statistics ===
No.	Nat.	Name	Age	League		Cup		UEFA Cup		Total		Discipline	
No.	Nat.	Name	Age	Apps	Goals	Apps	Goals	Apps	Goals	Apps	Goals	Booked	Sent off (straight red)
Goalkeepers
1	(Austria)	Karl Ehn	27	2+1						2+1			
1	(Austria)	Herbert Feurer	27	34		2		6		42			
Defenders
2	(Austria)	Bernd Krauss	24	31	1	2		6		39	1	9	1
3	(Austria)	Peter Persidis	34	9+2				0+2		9+4		1	1
4	(Austria)	Johann Pregesbauer	23	34	4	2		5		41	4	5	
5	(Austria)	Heribert Weber	26	25	3	2		6	1	33	4	3	
12	(Austria)	Kurt Garger	20	30+4		2		6		38+4		4	
16	(Austria)	Peter Sallmayer	20	1+4		0+1				1+5			
Midfielders
6	(Austria)	Reinhard Kienast	21	33	1	2	1	6		41	2	5	1
8	(Czechoslovakia)	Antonín Panenka	30	32+1	13	2		6	2	40+1	15	2	
10	(Austria)	Josef Hickersberger	33	20+1	3	2		1		23+1	3	1	
14	(Austria)	Rudolf Weinhofer	19	3+9	1			1+2		4+11	1		
15	(Austria)	Heinz Weiss	21	5+4	1			0+2		5+6	1		
17	(Soviet Union)	Anatoli Zinchenko	31	26+6	6	0+1		6		32+7	6	1	
18	(Austria)	Gerald Willfurth	18	1+9	2					1+9	2		
19	(Austria)	Rudolf Steinbauer	21	22+2		0+1		5		27+3		2	
Forwards
7	(Austria)	Johann Gröss	21	13+8	2	2				15+8	2	3	
9	(Austria)	Hans Krankl	28	32	19	2	1	6	3	40	23	5	1
11	(Austria)	Christian Keglevits	20	22+6	5	2	1	6		30+6	6	2	
13	(Austria)	Helmut Hofmann	20	21+7	7			0+1		21+8	7	1	

== Fixtures and results ==
Win Draw Loss

=== League ===
Rd	Date	Venue	Opponent	Res.	Att.	Goals and discipline
1	14.08.1981	A	Sturm Graz	2-4	12,000	Panenka 19', Krauss 22'
2	22.08.1981	H	LASK	3-1	8,500	Keglevits 17', Krankl 72' 82'
3	28.08.1981	A	Austria Salzburg	1-1	17,000	Kienast R. 88'
4	05.09.1981	H	Austria Wien	1-1	18,500	Krankl 52'
5	11.09.1981	H	Admira	2-0	10,000	Krankl 23', Panenka 59'
6	19.09.1981	A	GAK	3-0	5,000	Panenka 20' 69', Pregesbauer 22'
7	26.09.1981	H	VÖEST Linz	1-1	8,500	Krankl 43'
8	03.10.1981	A	Wacker Innsbruck	3-0	12,000	Zinchenko 4', Panenka 9', Krankl 43'; Kienast R. (red card) 33'
9	07.10.1981	H	Wiener SC	6-1	11,000	Hofmann H. 9', Panenka 24' 44', Pregesbauer 37', Weiss H. 48', Krankl 62'
10	17.10.1981	A	Wiener SC	0-0	8,000	
11	24.10.1981	H	Sturm Graz	2-2	5,500	Krankl 38' 49'
12	31.10.1981	A	LASK	0-2	6,000	
13	14.11.1981	H	Austria Salzburg	3-1	5,000	Zinchenko 4' 30', Panenka 89'
14	18.11.1981	A	Austria Wien	1-0	11,000	Weber H. 9'
15	21.11.1981	A	Admira	3-2	10,000	Pregesbauer 18', Keglevits 70', Krankl 90'
16	28.11.1981	H	GAK	2-1	4,500	Krankl 9', Weinhofer 27'
17	15.12.1981	A	VÖEST Linz	2-1	1,000	Krankl 48' (pen.), Panenka 58'
18	12.12.1981	H	Wacker Innsbruck	2-0	6,000	Krankl 47' (pen.), Hofmann H. 75'
19	09.03.1982	A	Sturm Graz	1-0	5,000	Zinchenko 67'
20	13.02.1982	H	LASK	1-2	5,000	Hickersberger 20'
21	20.02.1982	A	Austria Salzburg	3-0	7,000	Keglevits 36', Hickersberger 75', Krankl 78'
22	27.02.1982	H	Austria Wien	0-2	13,000	
23	06.03.1982	H	Admira	4-4	6,000	Oberhofer 8' (o.g.), Krankl 43' (pen.), Zinchenko 55', Hofmann H. 79'
24	13.03.1982	A	GAK	0-1	5,500	Krauss (red card) 59'
25	20.03.1982	H	VÖEST Linz	1-1	5,000	Hickersberger 31'
26	27.03.1982	A	Wacker Innsbruck	0-3	14,000	Persidis (red card) 40'
27	03.04.1982	H	Wiener SC	4-3	7,500	Gröss 7', Pregesbauer 15', Krankl 63' 67'
28	10.04.1982	A	Wiener SC	2-2	6,500	Hofmann H. 15', Panenka 71'
29	16.04.1982	H	Sturm Graz	2-1	6,500	Hofmann H. 35', Krankl 46'
30	23.04.1982	A	LASK	0-0	6,500	
31	30.04.1982	H	Austria Salzburg	2-2	5,000	Zinchenko 18', Willfurth 84'
32	04.05.1982	A	Austria Wien	3-0	30,000	Krankl 43', Gröss 62', Panenka 80'
33	08.05.1982	A	Admira	2-2	10,000	Weber H. 61', Hofmann H. 70'; Krankl (red card) 83'
34	15.05.1982	H	GAK	2-1	8,500	Weber H. 60', Willfurth 79'
35	22.05.1982	A	VÖEST Linz	0-1	3,800	
36	25.05.1982	H	Wacker Innsbruck	5-0	25,000	Keglevits 2' 16', Hofmann H. 54', Panenka 82' 88'

=== Cup ===
Rd	Date	Venue	Opponent	Res.	Att.	Goals and discipline
R2	19.08.1981	A	Simmering	2-1	7,000	Keglevits 9', Krankl 14'
R16	03.09.1981	A	Austria Wien	1-2	17,000	Kienast R. 53'

=== UEFA Cup ===
Rd	Date	Venue	Opponent	Res.	Att.	Goals and discipline
R1-L1	16.09.1981	H	Videoton (Hungary)	2-2	25,000	Weber H. 82', Panenka 90' (pen.)
R1-L2	30.09.1981	A	Videoton (Hungary)	2-0	18,000	Krankl 21' 83'
R2-L1	21.10.1981	H	PSV (Netherlands)	1-0	30,000	Panenka 71' (pen.)
R2-L2	04.11.1981	A	PSV (Netherlands)	1-2	22,000	Krankl 26'
R3-L1	25.11.1981	H	Real Madrid (Spain)	0-1	31,000	
R3-L2	09.12.1981	A	Real Madrid (Spain)	0-0	60,000	
