= 1986 Austrian Supercup =

- Event: 1986 Austrian Supercup
Rapid Wien	Austria Wien
3	1
- Date: 19 July 1986
- Venue: Gerhard Hanappi Stadium, Vienna
- Referee: Helmut Kohl
- Attendance: 2,900

The 1986 Austrian Supercup was a football match that saw the 1985–86 Bundesliga and 1985–86 Austrian Cup champions Austria Wien face off against 1985-86 Austrian Cup finalists Rapid Wien. The match was held on 19 July 1986 at the Gerhard Hanappi Stadium in Vienna. This was the inaugural Austrian Supercup, which went on to be played until 2004.

== Match details ==
19 July 1986
19:00 CET

Rapid Wien	3–1	Austria Wien
Kranjčar 40'; Halilović 43', 70'	Report	Polster 55'

Gerhard Hanappi Stadium, Vienna
Attendance: 2,900
Referee: Helmut Kohl

Rapid Wien:
GK	1	(Austria) Herbert Feurer
DF	3	(Austria) Kurt Garger
DF	6	(Austria) Reinhard Kienast
DF	5	(Austria) Heribert Weber	(yellow card) 33'
MF	10	(Socialist Federal Republic of Yugoslavia) Petar Bručić
MF	13	(Austria) Peter Hrstic
MF	14	(Austria) Rudolf Weinhofer
MF	15	(Austria) Karl Brauneder	(yellow card) 51'
MF	18	(Austria) Gerald Willfurth
FW	8	(Socialist Federal Republic of Yugoslavia) Sulejman Halilović		(substituted off) 76'
FW	9	(Socialist Federal Republic of Yugoslavia) Zlatko Kranjčar		(substituted off) 71'
Substitutes:
MF	11	(Austria) Hermann Stadler		(substituted on) 71'
MF	16	(Austria) Andreas Heraf		(substituted on) 76'
Manager:
(Socialist Federal Republic of Yugoslavia) Otto Barić

Austria Wien:
GK	1	(Austria) Franz Wohlfahrt
DF	-	(Austria) Erich Obermayer
DF	-	(Austria) Josef Degeorgi
DF	-	(Austria) Oswald Steiger
MF	-	(Austria) Ernst Baumeister	(yellow card) 33'	(substituted off) 59'
MF	-	(Austria) Ewald Türmer		(substituted off) 81'
MF	-	(Austria) Johann Dihanich	(yellow card) 61'
MF	-	(Austria) Herbert Prohaska	(yellow card) 50' (yellow-red card) 51'
FW	-	(Austria) Alfred Drabits	(red card) 51'
FW	-	(Hungary) Tibor Nyilasi
FW	-	(Austria) Toni Polster
Substitutes:
MF	7	(Austria) Andreas Ogris	(yellow card) 85'	(substituted on) 59'
MF	-	(Austria) Gerald Glatzmayer		(substituted on) 81'
Manager:
(Austria) Thomas Parits

== See also ==
- 1985–86 Austrian Football Bundesliga
- 1985–86 Austrian Cup
