= 1979–80 SK Rapid Wien season =

Rapid Wien
1979–80 season
- Coach: Walter Skocik
- Stadium: Gerhard-Hanappi-Stadion, Vienna, Austria
- Bundesliga: 5th
- Cup: Round of 16
- UEFA Cup: First round
- Top goalscorer: League: Vukan Perovic (10); All: Christian Keglevits (11)
- Average home league attendance: 7,700

The 1979–80 SK Rapid Wien season was the 82nd season in club history.

== Squad ==
=== Squad statistics ===
Nat.	Name	Age	League		Cup		UEFA Cup		Total		Discipline	
Nat.	Name	Age	Apps	Goals	Apps	Goals	Apps	Goals	Apps	Goals	Booked	Sent off (straight red)
Goalkeepers
(Austria)	Peter Barthold	25	0+1				1		1+1			
(Austria)	Karl Ehn	25	2		1				3			
(Austria)	Herbert Feurer	25	34		1		1		36			
Defenders
(Austria)	Bernd Krauss	22	36	4	2		2		40	4	3	
(Austria)	Martin Lefor	19	27+7		1		2		30+7		2	1
(Austria)	Peter Persidis	32	35		2		2		39		7	
(Austria)	Reinhard Trojan	24	0+3				0+1		0+4			
(Austria)	Heribert Weber	24	31	3	2	1	2		35	4	5	
Midfielders
(Austria)	Kurt Garger	18	6+6		1		0+1		7+7		1	
(Austria)	Günther Happich	27	13+3	1	1+1				14+4	1	1	
(Austria)	Christian Janitsch	19	0+1						0+1			
(Austria)	Reinhard Kienast	19	33+1	5	2		1		36+1	5	7	
(Austria)	Johann Pregesbauer	21	34	4	0+1		2		36+1	4		
(Austria)	Peter Sallmayer	18	26+6	2	1+1		2	1	29+7	3	5	
(Austria)	Heinz Weiss	19	19+10		2	1	2		23+10	1		
Forwards
(Denmark)	Lars Francker	27			0+1				0+1			
(Austria)	Johann Gröss	19	3	1					3	1		
(Austria)	Helmut Hofmann	18	17+13	1	2	1	1		20+13	2		
(Austria)	Christian Keglevits	18	33+1	7	2	3	2	1	37+1	11	1	1
(Austria)	Johann Krejcirik	27	32+4	7	2	2	2		36+4	9	5	
(Socialist Federal Republic of Yugoslavia)	Vukan Perovic	26	13+2	10					13+2	10	2	
(West Germany)	Peter Salisch	18	2+1						2+1			
(Austria)	Rudolf Wrehsnig	18	0+1						0+1			

== Fixtures and results ==
Win Draw Loss

=== League ===
Rd	Date	Venue	Opponent	Res.	Att.	Goals and discipline
1	17.08.1979	H	Vienna	0-0	8,500	
2	24.08.1979	A	Admira	2-2	4,000	Pregesbauer 74', Hofmann H. 90'; Keglevits (red card) 67'
3	31.08.1979	H	GAK	2-0	6,000	Pregesbauer 64', Keglevits 66'
4	07.09.1979	H	LASK	0-0	11,400	
5	15.09.1979	A	Wiener SC	0-3	8,500	
6	22.09.1979	H	Sturm Graz	3-0	500	Krejcirik 35' 60', Weber H. 78'
7	28.09.1979	A	Austria Salzburg	0-0	12,000	
8	06.10.1979	H	Austria Wien	0-0	18,000	
9	12.10.1979	A	VÖEST Linz	0-4	11,000	
10	20.10.1979	H	VÖEST Linz	2-0	7,600	Keglevits 70' 86'
11	27.10.1979	A	Vienna	0-1	8,000	Lefor (red card) 65'
12	03.11.1979	H	Admira	3-0	4,000	Krejcirik 11' 56' 88' (pen.)
13	10.11.1979	A	GAK	0-2	3,000	
14	17.11.1979	A	LASK	1-4	10,000	Krejcirik 61'
15	24.11.1979	H	Wiener SC	1-1	4,200	Pregesbauer 56'
16	01.12.1979	A	Sturm Graz	1-0	5,000	Kienast R. 53'
17	08.12.1979	H	Austria Salzburg	5-0	3,800	Sallmayer 9', Weber H. 23', Gröss 31', Krejcirik 43', Kienast R. 50'
18	16.02.1980	A	Austria Wien	0-0	8,500	
19	23.02.1980	H	Vienna	0-1	7,800	
20	01.03.1980	A	Admira	1-1	3,000	Unknown 79' (o.g.)
21	08.03.1980	H	GAK	3-1	3,500	Krauss 2' 36', Happich 56' (pen.)
22	15.03.1980	H	LASK	0-0	5,500	
23	23.03.1980	A	Wiener SC	3-2	5,000	Krauss 11', Perovic 65' 87'
24	29.03.1980	H	Sturm Graz	3-0	14,000	Kienast R. 21', Perovic 58' 62'
25	16.04.1980	A	Austria Salzburg	1-2	8,500	Kienast R. 23'
26	12.04.1980	H	Austria Wien	1-1	19,000	Perovic 19'
27	18.04.1980	A	VÖEST Linz	0-1	7,500	
28	23.04.1980	H	VÖEST Linz	5-0	2,000	Keglevits 12' 66', Pregesbauer 14', Perovic 60' 88'
29	26.04.1980	A	Vienna	0-4	8,000	
30	03.05.1980	H	Admira	1-2	15,000	Perovic 61'
31	06.05.1980	A	GAK	1-1	3,000	Keglevits 85'
32	10.05.1980	A	LASK	0-0	6,000	
33	16.05.1980	H	Wiener SC	0-0	5,000	
34	24.05.1980	A	Sturm Graz	1-3	5,000	Perovic 88'
35	30.05.1980	H	Austria Salzburg	4-1	2,500	Krauss 22', Perovic 39', Kienast R. 54', Sallmayer 60'
36	07.06.1980	A	Austria Wien	2-3	17,100	Keglevits 15', Weber H. 34' (pen.)

=== Cup ===
Rd	Date	Venue	Opponent	Res.	Att.	Goals and discipline
R2	01.11.1979	A	Hannersdorf	7-1	3,500	Weiss H. 14', Keglevits 17' 68', Krejcirik 19' 90', Weber H. 59' (pen.), Hofmann H. 62'
R16	06.11.1979	A	VÖEST Linz	1-2	2,000	Keglevits 8'

=== UEFA Cup ===
Rd	Date	Venue	Opponent	Res.	Att.	Goals and discipline
R1-L1	19.09.1979	H	Diosgyöri (Hungary)	0-1	14,000	
R1-L2	03.10.1979	A	Diosgyöri (Hungary)	2-3	30,000	Keglevits 43', Sallmayer 60'
