= 1986–87 FK Austria Wien season =

Austria Wien
1986-87 season
- Manager: Thomas Parits
- Stadium: Franz Horr Stadium
- Bundesliga: 2nd
- ÖFB-Cup: Quarter-finals
- European Cup: Second round
- Austrian Supercup: Runners-up
- Top goalscorer: League: Toni Polster (39 goals); All: Toni Polster (47 goals)
- Average home league attendance: 6,411
- Biggest win: 9–0 v. FC Waidhofen/Ybbs (A); 19 August 1986
- Biggest defeat: 1–3 v. Swarovski Tirol (A); 5 May 1987

Austria Wien ended the first part of the 1986-87 Bundesliga in first place with 33 points, three more than their rivals Rapid Wien, but eventually lost the title to Rapid in the last round of the season due to higher goal difference from Rapid and to a draw against Sturm Graz away.

In the Austrian Cup, they reached the quarter-finals where they lost to Swarovski Tirol, and they lost to Bayern Munich in the second round of the European Cup.

Star striker Toni Polster, who would leave for Torino FC in the summer, had his best season with the club, scoring 47 goals in total, winning the European Golden Shoe.

== Squad ==
Note: Flags indicate national team as defined under FIFA eligibility rules; some limited exceptions apply. Players may hold more than one non-FIFA nationality.

No.	Pos.	Nation	Player
—	GK	AUT	Franz Wohlfahrt
—	DF	AUT	Josef Degeorgi
—	DF	AUT	Robert Frind
—	DF	AUT	Hans-Peter Frühwirth
—	DF	AUT	Gerald Glatzmayer
—	DF	AUT	Erich Obermayer
—	DF	AUT	Anton Pfeffer
—	DF	AUT	Oswald Steiger
—	MF	AUT	Ernst Baumeister
—	MF	AUT	Johann Dihanich
—	MF	HUN	Tibor Nyilasi
—	MF	AUT	Herbert Prohaska
—	MF	AUT	Christian Prosenik
—	MF	AUT	Ewald Türmer

No.	Pos.	Nation	Player
—	FW	AUT	Alfred Drabits
—	FW	AUT	Tino Jessenitschnig
—	FW	AUT	Andreas Ogris
—	FW	AUT	Toni Polster
—	FW	AUT	Gerhard Steinkogler

== Competitions ==
=== Austrian Supercup ===
19 July 1986 Final	Rapid Wien	3-1	Austria Wien	Gerhard-Hanappi-Stadion, Vienna
19:00	Kranjčar 40'; Halilović 43', 70'	Report	Polster 55'	Attendance: 2,900; Referee: Helmut Kohl

=== Bundesliga ===
==== League table ====
Pos	Team	Pld	W	D	L	GF	GA	GD	Pts	Qualification or relegation
1	Rapid Wien	36	22	8	6	94	43	+51	52	Qualification to European Cup first round
2	Austria Wien	36	21	10	5	86	40	+46	52	Qualification to UEFA Cup first round
3	Swarovski Tirol	36	20	5	11	78	57	+21	45	Qualification to Cup Winners' Cup first round
4	Linzer ASK	36	17	6	13	56	59	−3	40	Qualification to UEFA Cup first round
5	Admira/Wacker	36	13	7	16	63	55	+8	33	

Source: bundesliga.at
Rules for classification: 1) points; 2) goal difference; 3) number of goals scored.

==== Matches ====
22 July 1986 1	Wiener Sport-Club	3-5	Austria Wien	Sportclub-Platz, Vienna
19:30	Abfalterer 23', 50'; Krankl 60'	Report	Nyilasi 24', 76'; Polster 35', 41', 48'	Attendance: 7,000; Referee: Alfred Wieser

27 July 1986 2	Austria Wien	1-2	Swarovski Tirol	Franz Horr Stadium, Vienna
10:15	Polster 74'	Report	Müller 47'; Roscher 56'	Attendance: 12,000; Referee: Gerd Adanitsch

1 August 1986 3	Austria Wien	6-3	SC Eisenstadt	Franz Horr Stadium, Vienna
19:00	Ogris 4', 50'; Prohaska 24'; Polster 53', 57' (pen.); Nyilasi 83'	Report	Netuschill 64'; Drazan 69'; Perstling 81'	Attendance: 2,300; Referee: Arthur Pernkopf

5 August 1986 4	Grazer AK	2-0	Austria Wien	GAK-Platz, Graz
18:30	Spirk 29'; Pigel 77'	Report		Attendance: 6,000; Referee: Franz Bogendorfer

8 August 1986 5	Austria Wien	5-1	LASK	Franz Horr Stadium, Vienna
19:00	Glatzmayer 28'; Nyilasi 34'; Polster 40', 50', 66' (pen.)	Report	Westerthaler 80'	Attendance: 2,600; Referee: Kuno Felder

15 August 1987 6	Admira Wacker	1-3	Austria Wien	Bundesstadion Südstadt, Maria Enzersdorf
19:30	Binder 47'	Report	Ogris 41'; Polster 63'; Drabits 73'	Attendance: 6,000; Referee: Fritz Stanzel

24 August 1987 7	Austria Wien	1-0	First Vienna	Franz Horr Stadium, Vienna
10:15	Nyilasi 87'	Report		Attendance: 5,000; Referee: Heinz Prohaska

30 August 1986 8	Rapid Wien	2-2	Austria Wien	Gerhard-Hanappi-Stadion, Vienna
16:00	Willfurth 17'; Kranjčar 34'	Report	Polster 8', 40'	Attendance: 15,500; Referee: Horst Brummeier

3 September 1986 9	Austria Wien	4-1	Austria Klagenfurt	Franz Horr Stadium, Vienna
19:30	Polster 32', 57'; Drabits 51', 83'	Report	Raczynski 40' (pen.)	Attendance: 3,000; Referee: Karl Finzinger

6 September 1986 10	Sturm Graz	0-2	Austria Wien	Sturm-Platz, Graz
16:00		Report	Polster 63'; Baumeister 70'	Attendance: 8,000; Referee: Franz Latzin

13 September 1986 11	Austria Wien	3-0	VÖEST Linz	Franz Horr Stadium, Vienna
16:00	Polster 45+1', 47'; Ogris 60'	Report		Attendance: 4,100; Referee: Adolf Wukisewitsch

20 September 1986 12	VÖEST Linz	1-1	Austria Wien	Linzer Stadion, Linz
16:00	Haider 23'	Report	Degeorgi 15'	Attendance: 2,500; Referee: Alfred Wieser

28 September 1986 13	Austria Wien	4-1	Wiener Sport-Club	Franz Horr Stadium, Vienna
10:15	Drabits 16'; Polster 31'; Ogris 64', 66'	Report	Abfalterer 58'	Attendance: 5,600; Referee: Fritz Stanzel

4 October 1986 14	Swarovski Tirol	2-4	Austria Wien	Tivol Stadion, Innsbruck
15:00	Kalinić 40'; Pacult 63'	Report	Polster 6', 85'; Prohaska 16'; Baumeister 21'	Attendance: 16,000; Referee: Horst Brummeier

10 October 1986 15	SC Eisenstadt	1-5	Austria Wien	Lindenstadion, Eisenstadt
19:00	Perstling 5'	Report	Türmer 28'; Drabits 37'; Polster 57', 88'; Frischmann 62' (o.g.)	Attendance: 7,500; Referee: Gerald Losert

18 October 1986 16	Austria Wien	1-1	Grazer AK	Franz Horr Stadium, Vienna
14:30	Drabits 12'	Report	Koschak 61'	Attendance: 2,300; Referee: Wolfgang Klocker

25 October 1986 17	LASK	1-2	Austria Wien	Linzer Stadion, Linz
14:30	Paseka 45'	Report	Baumeister 5', 6'	Attendance: 4,000; Referee: Franz Bogendorfer

1 November 1986 18	Austria Wien	2-0	Admira Wacker	Franz Horr Stadium, Vienna
15:30	Polster 2'; Drabits 71'	Report		Attendance: 3,000; Referee: Franz Wöhrer

8 November 1986 19	First Vienna	4-2	Austria Wien	Hohe Warte Stadium, Vienna
14:00	Kempes 27', 80'; Artner 45'; Webora 61'	Report	Degeorgi 48'; Polster 62'	Attendance: 3,500; Referee: Friedrich Kaupe

15 November 1986 20	Austria Wien	1-1	Rapid Wien	Praterstadion, Vienna
15:00	Polster 41'	Report	Kienast 11'	Attendance: 17,000; Referee: Franz Latzin

22 November 1986 21	Austria Klagenfurt	1-1	Austria Wien	Wörthersee Stadion, Klagenfurt
14:00	Cerin 65'	Report	Polster 70' (pen.)	Attendance: 1,200; Referee: Rudolf Finzinger

29 November 1986 22	Austria Wien	2-0	Sturm Graz	Franz Horr Stadium, Vienna
14:00	Türmer 60'; Drabits 82'	Report		Attendance: 2,000; Referee: Adolf Mathias

15 March 1987 23	Austria Wien	1-1	LASK	Franz Horr Stadium, Vienna
10:30	Polster 21'	Report	Westerthaler 5'	Attendance: 5,600; Referee: Heinz Holzmann

22 March 1987 24	Admira Wacker	1-1	Austria Wien	Bundesstadion Südstadt, Maria Enzersdorf
10:30	Zsak 40'	Report	Baumeister 58'	Attendance: 8,500; Referee: Fritz Stanzel

4 April 1987 25	Austria Wien	2-1	Wiener Sport-Club	Praterstadion, Vienna
16:00	Baumeister 2'; Drabits 52'	Report	Reisinger 55'	Attendance: 6,000; Referee: Horst Brummeier

11 April 1987 26	Rapid Wien	1-3	Austria Wien	Gerhard-Hanappi-Stadion, Vienna
16:00	Kranjčar 80'	Report	Kienast 26' (o.g.); Drabits 71'; Polster 77'	Attendance: 17,500; Referee: Helmut Kohl

25 April 1987 27	Austria Wien	5-1	VÖEST Linz	Franz Horr Stadium, Vienna
16:00	Polster 25', 76', 78'; Drabits 62', 69'	Report	Werner 74' (pen.)	Attendance: 3,000; Referee: Wolfgang Klocker

2 May 1987 28	Swarovski Tirol	1-0	Austria Wien	Tivoli Stadion, Innsbruck
16:00	Pacult 12'	Report		Attendance: 12,000; Referee: Hubert Forstinger

9 May 1987 29	Austria Wien	1-1	Sturm Graz	Franz Horr Stadium, Vienna
16:00	Nyilasi 80'	Report	Marko 26'	Attendance: 2,200; Referee: Karl Finzinger

15 May 1987 30	LASK	0-0	Austria Wien	Linzer Stadion, Linz
19:00		Report		Attendance: 9,000; Referee: Helmut Kohl

23 May 1987 31	Austria Wien	3-1	Admira Wacker	Franz Horr Stadium, Vienna
16:00	Prohaska 25'; Polster 50', 75'	Report	Petrinović 45'	Attendance: 2,200; Referee: Friedrich Kaupe

31 May 1987 32	Wiener Sport-Club	0-2	Austria Wien	Sportclub-Platz, Vienna
10:15		Report	Frind 79'; Drabits 85'	Attendance: 5,000; Referee: Gerhard Benedek

4 June 1987 33	Austria Wien	0-2	Rapid Wien	Praterstadion, Vienna
16:00		Report	Kienast 30'; Kranjčar 58'	Attendance: 17,000; Referee: Franz Latzin

12 June 1987 34	VÖEST Linz	0-4	Austria Wien	Linzer Stadion, Linz
19:00		Report	Polster 13', 51', 56', 78'	Attendance: 2,100; Referee: Franz Bogendorfer

20 June 1987 35	Austria Wien	5-0	Swarovski Tirol	Praterstadion, Vienna
16:00	Nyilasi 9', 35'; Polster 66'; Drabits 76', 80'	Report		Attendance: 20,000; Referee: Alfred Wieser

26 June 1987 36	Sturm Graz	2-2	Austria Wien	Sturm-Platz, Graz
19:00	Delzepich 5' (pen.); Teskeredžić 76'	Report	Nyilasi 36'; Polster 55' (pen.)	Attendance: 5,000; Referee: Horst Brummeier

=== ÖFB-Cup ===
19 August 1986 Second round	FC Waidhofen/Ybbs	0-9	Austria Wien	Waidhofen an der Ybbs
17:30		Report	Polster 23'; Ogris 25', 29'; Nyilasi 26', 34'; Prohaska 46'; Steiger 48'; Baumeister 65'; Dihanich 85'	Attendance: 1,500; Referee: Gerhard Pum

28 March 1987 Round of 32	SV Neuberg	2-5	Austria Wien	Neuberg
13:30	Radostits 43'; Konrad 62'	Report	Polster 7', 34'; Glatzmayer 19'; Drabits 33'; Ogris 61'	Attendance: 2,000; Referee: Gerd Adanitsch

18 April 1987 Round of 16	Austria Wien	0-2	Kremser SC	Bundesstadion Südstadt, Maria Enzersdorf
13:30		Report	Kienbacher 37'; Milosavljević 67'	Attendance: 3,000; Referee: Franz Bogendorfer
Note: On April 23, 1987, the match was awarded 3-0 to Austria Vienna after Krems fielded the player Milosavljević (4 yellow cards) without authorization.

5 May 1987 Quarter-final	Swarovski Tirol	3-1	Austria Wien	Tivoli Stadion, Innsbruck
19:30	Pacult 22' (pen.), 63'; Roscher 87'	Report	Polster 56'	Attendance: 9,000; Referee: Franz Latzin

=== European Cup ===
==== First round ====
17 September 1986 First leg	Avenir Beggen (Luxembourg)	0–3	Austria Wien	Stade rue Henri Dunant, Beggen
18:30		Report	Drabits 14'; Frind 67'; Polster 71'	Attendance: 474; Referee: Renzo Peduzzi (Switzerland)

1 October 1986 Second leg	Austria Wien	3-0	(Luxembourg) Avenir Beggen	Stadion Lehen, Salzburg
18:00	Ogris 42'; Polster 60'; Steinkogler 78'	Report		Attendance: 3,500; Referee: Bela Szabo (Hungary)

==== Second round ====
22 October 1986 First leg	Bayern Munich (Germany)	2-0	Austria Wien	Olympiastadion, Munich
19:00	Flick 44'; Matthäus 73' (pen.)	Report		Attendance: 42,000; Referee: Vojtech Christov (Czechoslovakia)

5 November 1986 Second leg	Austria Wien	1-1	(Germany) Bayern Munich	Praterstadion, Vienna
18:30	Polster 54'	Report	Wohlfarth 34'	Attendance: 47,000; Referee: Alexis Ponnet (Belgium)
