= 1985 European Cup Winners' Cup final =

- Match programme cover
- Event: 1984–85 European Cup Winners' Cup
Everton	Rapid Wien
(England)	(Austria)
3	1
- Date: 15 May 1985
- Venue: Feijenoord Stadion, Rotterdam
- Referee: Paolo Casarin (Italy)
- Attendance: 38,500

The 1985 European Cup Winners' Cup Final was a football match contested between Everton of England and Rapid Wien of Austria. It was the final match of the 1984–85 European Cup Winners' Cup and the 25th European Cup Winners' Cup final. The final was held at Feijenoord Stadion in Rotterdam, Netherlands, on 15 May 1985. Everton, which dominated throughout, won the match 3–1 thanks to goals by Andy Gray, Trevor Steven and Kevin Sheedy. Everton were unable to defend the trophy: as league champions they would have entered the 1985–86 European Cup, but they were not permitted to play in either competition following the events at the Heysel Stadium, which saw all English clubs banned from European competitions.

== Route to the final ==
(England) Everton					(Austria) Rapid Wien			
Opponent	Agg.	1st leg	2nd leg		Opponent	Agg.	1st leg	2nd leg
(Republic of Ireland) University College Dublin	1–0	0–0 (A)	1–0 (H)	First round	(Turkey) Beşiktaş	5–2	4–1 (H)	1–1 (A)
(Czechoslovakia) Internacionál Bratislava	4–0	1–0 (A)	3–0 (H)	Second round	(Scotland) Celtic	4–1	3–1 (H)	1–0 (A)
(Netherlands) Fortuna Sittard	5–0	3–0 (H)	2–0 (A)	Quarter-finals	(East Germany) Dynamo Dresden	5–3	0–3 (A)	5–0 (H)
(West Germany) Bayern Munich	3–1	0–0 (A)	3–1 (H)	Semi-finals	(Soviet Union) Dynamo Moscow	4–2	3–1 (H)	1–1 (A)

== Match ==
=== Details ===
15 May 1985
20:15 CEST

Everton (England)	3–1	(Austria) Rapid Wien
Gray 58'; Steven 73'; Sheedy 86'	Report	Krankl 85'

Feijenoord Stadion, Rotterdam
Attendance: 38,500
Referee: Paolo Casarin (Italy)

Everton	Rapid Wien

GK	1	(Wales) Neville Southall
RB	2	(England) Gary Stevens	(yellow card) 43'
CB	4	(Wales) Kevin Ratcliffe (c)
CB	5	(England) Derek Mountfield
LB	3	(Wales) Pat Van Den Hauwe
RM	7	(England) Trevor Steven
CM	6	(England) Peter Reid
CM	10	(England) Paul Bracewell
LM	11	(Republic of Ireland) Kevin Sheedy
CF	8	(Scotland) Graeme Sharp
CF	9	(Scotland) Andy Gray
Substitutes:
DF	12	(England) Alan Harper
DF	13	(England) John Bailey
MF	14	(England) Kevin Richardson
MF	15	(England) Ian Atkins
GK	16	(England) Jim Arnold
Manager:
(England) Howard Kendall

GK	1	(Austria) Michael Konsel
DF	2	(Austria) Leo Lainer
DF	3	(Austria) Kurt Garger
DF	4	(Austria) Karl Brauneder
DF	5	(Austria) Heribert Weber	(yellow card) 39'
MF	6	(Austria) Reinhard Kienast
MF	7	(Socialist Federal Republic of Yugoslavia) Zlatko Kranjčar
MF	8	(Austria) Peter Hrstic
FW	9	(Austria) Hans Krankl (c)
MF	10	(Austria) Rudi Weinhofer		(substituted off) 67'
FW	11	(Austria) Peter Pacult		(substituted off) 60'
Substitutes:
MF	13	(Czechoslovakia) Antonín Panenka		(substituted on) 67'
FW	15	(Austria) Johann Gröss		(substituted on) 60'
Manager:
(Socialist Federal Republic of Yugoslavia) Otto Barić

Match rules

- 90 minutes.
- 30 minutes of extra time if necessary.
- Penalty shoot-out if scores still level.
- Five named substitutes.
- Maximum of two substitutions.

== See also ==
- 1984–85 European Cup Winners' Cup
- 1985 European Cup Final
- 1985 UEFA Cup Final
- Everton F.C. in European football
