= 1984–85 Austrian Cup =

Tournament details
- Country: Austria

Final positions
- Champions: Rapid Wien
- Runners-up: Austria Wien

The 1984–85 Austrian Cup (German: ÖFB-Cup) was the 51st season of Austria's nationwide football cup competition. The final was held at the Gerhard Hanappi Stadium, Vienna on 13 June 1985.

The competition was won by Rapid Wien after beating Austria Wien 6–5 on penalties after the match finished 3–3 after extra time.

== Second round ==
SV Oberwart received a bye to the next round.

Team 1	Score	Team 2
14 August 1984
ASK Ybbs	0–6	SK Rapid Wien
19 August 1984
SC Kundl	1–3	IG Bregenz/Dornbirn
21 August 1984
USV Salzburg	0–2	SV Austria Salzburg
SK Mittersill	2–3	Salzburger AK 1914
FC Zell am See	1–0	ASK Salzburg
SG VSE S.Pölten/Gablitz	1–4	FK Austria Wien
VfB Union Mödling	2–0	First Vienna FC
SV Neuberg	0–1	SV Spittal/Drau
SC Untersiebenbrunn	0–5	SC Eisenstadt
Donau Linz	0–5	VOEST Linz
1. SC Wiener Neustadt	0–3	Favoritner AC
LUV Graz	1–2	Wolfsberger AC
FC Andorf	0–3	Linzer ASK
SV Feldkirchen	0–1	Grazer AK
SC Imst	1–4	SSW Innsbruck
WSG Brückl	1–4	ASK Voitsberg
Mautner Wien	1–0	SC Neusiedl am See
UFC Purbach	0–1	Kremser SC
VfB Hohenems	0–3	WSG Wattens
FC Waidhofen/Ybbs	0–2	Wiener Sport-Club
SC Zwettl	0–3	Admira/Wacker
ASKÖ Steyrermühl	0–2	Donawitzer SV Alpine
SV Gmunden	0–5	SK Vorwärts Steyr
TSV Hartberg	2–3	SK Sturm Graz
ASK Nettingsdorf	2–3	Kapfenberger SV
Rapid Lienz	1–3 (a.e.t.)	Austria Klagenfurt
SV Heid Stockerau	2–4 (a.e.t.)	Badener AC
SC Pinkafeld	0–0 (a.e.t.) (3–4 p)	1. Simmeringer SC
SV Thörl	0–0 (a.e.t.) (4–2 p)	SV Flavia Solva
Viktoria 62 Bregenz	1–1 (a.e.t.) (1–4 p)	SC Kufstein
Fürnitz	0–0 (a.e.t.) (3–4 p)	SV St.Veit

== Third round ==
Team 1	Score	Team 2
27 August 1984
Linzer ASK	4–0	Austria Klagenfurt
28 August 1984
FC Zell am See	1–2	WSG Wattens
SC Kufstein	0–0 (a.e.t.) (2–4 p)	SV Austria Salzburg
Salzburger AK 1914	0–2	SV Spittal/Drau
Wolfsberger AC	4–0	SV Thörl
SV St. Veit	0–1	SK Sturm Graz
Donawitzer SV Alpine	4–2	ASK Voitsberg
Kapfenberger SV	1–2	Grazer AK
Mautner Wien	3–2	1. Simmeringer SC
Admira/Wacker	7–0	Badener AC
SSW Innsbruck	4–1	IG Bregenz/Dornbirn
FK Austria Wien	3–	Wiener Sport-Club
VfB Union Mödling	0–5	SK Rapid Wien
VOEST Linz	0–1	SK Vorwärts Steyr
SC Eisenstadt	4–1	Favoritner AC
Kremser SC	4–2	SV Oberwart

== Fourth round ==
Team 1	Score	Team 2
2 March 1985
Grazer AK	1–2	FK Austria Wien
Linzer ASK	2–5	SK Rapid Wien
Admira/Wacker	5–5 (a.e.t.) (4–2 p)	SV Spittal/Drau
WSG Wattens	0–5	SSW Innsbruck
5 March 1985
SK Sturm Graz	3–0	Donawitzer SV Alpine
9 March 1985
Wolfsberger AC	3–0	Mautner Wien
SK Vorwärts Steyr	0–2	Kremser SC
26 March 1985
SC Eisenstadt	0–0 (a.e.t.) (6–5 p)	SV Austria Salzburg

== Quarter-finals ==
Team 1	Score	Team 2
2 April 1985
SSW Innsbruck	1–2 (a.e.t.)	Admira/Wacker
FK Austria Wien	9–0	Wolfsberger AC
SC Eisenstadt	0–1	SK Rapid Wien
SK Sturm Graz	2–1	Kremser SC

== Semi-finals ==
The first leg matches were played on 28 May, while the second leg matches were played on 4 June 1985.

Team 1	Agg.	Team 2	1st leg	2nd leg
SK Sturm Graz	1–8	FK Austria Wien	1–3	0–5
SK Rapid Wien	7–4	Admira/Wacker	5–2	2–2

== Final ==
13 June 1985
19:30

SK Rapid Wien	3–3 (a.e.t.)	FK Austria Wien
Kranjčar 79', 91'; Krankl 104' (pen.)	Report	Nyilasi 88', 93'; Drabits 100'
Penalties
Krankl (penalty scored); Panenka (penalty scored); Kranjčar (penalty scored); Hrstic (penalty scored); Pacult (penalty scored); Brauneder (penalty scored)	6–5	(penalty scored) Nyilasi; (penalty scored) Drazan; (penalty scored) Obermayer; (penalty scored) Dihanich; (penalty scored) Drabits; (penalty missed) Türmer

Gerhard Hanappi Stadium, Vienna
Attendance: 15,000
Referee: Franz Wöhrer
