= 1985–86 Austrian Cup =

Tournament details
- Country: Austria

Final positions
- Champions: Austria Wien
- Runners-up: Rapid Wien

The 1985–86 Austrian Cup (German: ÖFB-Cup) was the 52nd season of Austria's nationwide football cup competition. The final was held at the Gerhard Hanappi Stadium, Vienna on 6 May 1986.

The competition was won by Austria Wien after beating Rapid Wien 6–4.

== Third round ==
Team 1	Score	Team 2
27 August 1985
ASK Ybbs	1–4	Kremser SC
ATSV Timelkam	2–0 (a.e.t.)	Deutschlandsberger SC
Austria Tabak Linz	0–5	Villacher SV
FC Waidhofen/Ybbs	0–1	SV Schwechat
Kapfenberger SV	0–2	First Vienna FC
SC Kundl	2–0	IG Bregenz/Dornbirn
SC Zwettl	1–3	Wiener Sport-Club
SK Bischofshofen	2–3	SC Austria Lustenau
SV Braunau	1–1 (a.e.t.) (4–3 p)	SV St. Veit
SV Feldkirchen	1–3	SK Vorwärts Steyr
SV Garsten	0–1 (a.e.t.)	Rapid Lienz
SV Oberwart	0–2	Favoritner AC
SVG Bleiburg	2–2 (a.e.t.) (4–5 p)	SV Spittal/Drau
Slovan/HAC	3–1	1. SC Wiener Neustadt
VSE St. Pölten	12–0	FC Andau
28 August 1985
Admira Dornbirn	1–2	SV Austria Salzburg
Chemie Linz	1–4	SV Flavia Solva
Eggenberger SK Graz	9–2	SC Weiz
Innsbrucker SK/SK Rum	0–1	WSG Wattens
VfB Union Mödling	2–0	Floridsdorfer AC

== Fourth round ==
Team 1	Score	Team 2
3 September 1985
ATSV Timelkam	1–7	VOEST Linz
Eggenberger SK Graz	2–4 (a.e.t.)	Donawitzer SV Alpine
Kremser SC	1–1 (a.e.t.) (4–3 p)	SV Schwechat
Linzer ASK	6–0	SV Spittal/Drau
SK Rapid Wien	4–1	Favoritner AC
SC Kundl	6–2	SSW Innsbruck
SV Austria Salzburg	8–0	SC Austria Lustenau
SV Braunau	1–2	Austria Klagenfurt
Slovan/HAC	0–4	SC Eisenstadt
SK Sturm Graz	5–1	SV Flavia Solva
VSE St. Pölten	2–6	Admira/Wacker
VfB Union Mödling	0–7	FK Austria Wien
Villacher SV	5–1	Rapid Lienz
SK Vorwärts Steyr	1–1 (a.e.t.) (7–6 p)	Grazer AK
WSG Wattens	1–2	Salzburger AK 1914
Wiener Sport-Club	2–4	First Vienna FC

== Fifth round ==
Team 1	Score	Team 2
24 September 1985
SC Kundl	2–3	SK Vorwärts Steyr
31 March 1986
Salzburger AK 1914	2–2 (a.e.t.) (4–3 p)	Admira/Wacker
1 April 1986
Austria Klagenfurt	2–1	Kremser SC
DSV Leoben	4–1	Villacher SV
SK Rapid Wien	6–0	SV Austria Salzburg
VOEST Linz	1–2	FK Austria Wien
First Vienna FC	0–1	SK Sturm Graz
2 April 1986
Linzer ASK	1–0	SC Eisenstadt

== Quarter-finals ==
Team 1	Score	Team 2
15 April 1986
Austria Klagenfurt	2–0	Linzer ASK
FK Austria Wien	4–0	Salzburger AK 1914
SK Rapid Wien	3–0	Donawitzer SV Alpine
SK Sturm Graz	0–1 (a.e.t.)	SK Vorwärts Steyr

== Semi-finals ==
Team 1	Score	Team 2
29 April 1986
FK Austria Wien	2–0	SK Sturm Graz
SK Rapid Wien	2–0	Austria Klagenfurt

== Final ==
6 May 1986
19:15

SK Rapid Wien	4–6 (a.e.t.)	FK Austria Wien
Halilović 7' (pen.); Kienast 45', 101'; Kranjčar 62'	Report	Degeorgi 9'; Steinkogler 50', 116'; Polster 82' (pen.), 99'; Dihanich 104'

Gerhard Hanappi Stadium, Vienna
Attendance: 16,500
Referee: Gerald Losert
