= 1982–83 Austrian Cup =

Tournament details
- Country: Austria

Final positions
- Champions: Rapid Wien
- Runners-up: SSW Innsbruck

The 1982–83 Austrian Cup (German: ÖFB-Cup) was the 49th season of Austria's nationwide football cup competition. The final was played over two legs, on 19 April 1983 at the Gerhard Hanappi Stadium, Vienna and on 3 May 1983 at the Tivoli, Innsbruck.

The competition was won by Rapid Wien after beating SSW Innsbruck 8–0 on aggregate.

== First round ==
Team 1	Score	Team 2
31 August 1982
1. Brigittenauer SC	1–5	1. Simmeringer SC
ASK Voitsberg	0–1 (a.e.t.)	SK VOEST Linz
Admira Dornbirn	1–0	SV Austria Salzburg
Badener AC	3–1	SC Tulln
Chemie Linz	1–3	Union Wels
ESK Graz	2–1	Villacher SV
FC Höchst	0–2	VfB Hohenems
Floridsdorfer AC	1–0	SC Eisenstadt
ASKÖ Fürnitz	0–4	Linzer ASK
SV Rapid Lienz	2–1	SV St. Veit
Rot-Weiß Knittelfeld	2–1 (a.e.t.)	Wolfsberger AC
SC Hermagor	1–3	SK Sturm Graz
SC Imst	2–0	SV Wörgl
SC Neunkirchen	3–0	FC Atzgersdorf
SC Kufstein	2–0	ASK Salzburg
SK Mittersill	2–0	SC Schwaz
SK Tamsweg	0–7	SSW Innsbruck
SV Garsten	0–4	Grazer AK
SV Guggenbach	1–4	Austria Klagenfurt
SV Oberwart	0–4	FC Admira/Wacker
SV Spittal/Drau	2–1	Donawitzer SV Alpine
UFC Purbach	0–2	First Vienna FC
USV Rudersdorf	0–1 (a.e.t.)	SC Neusiedl am See
UFC Salzburg	0–3	Salzburger AK 1914
Kremser SC	1–3	FK Austria Wien
SV Schwechat	1–4	SK Rapid Wien
SV Traun	1–3	SV Gmunden
1 September 1982
SV Bad Schallerbach	0–3	Kapfenberger SV
SV Güssing	3–2	Favoritner AC
Slovan/HAC	2–1 (a.e.t.)	Wiener Sport-Club
SK Vorwärts Steyr	3–1	SV Flavia Solva

== Second round ==
Team 1	Score	Team 2
26 October 1982
Badener AC	1–7	FK Austria Wien
ESK Graz	0–9	SK Sturm Graz
Floridsdorfer AC	1–0	SC Neusiedl am See
SV Rapid Lienz	1–4	Kapfenberger SV
Rot-Weiß Knittelfeld	1–2	Union Wels
SC Imst	1–3	SSW Innsbruck
SC Neunkirchen	0–2	First Vienna FC
SC Kufstein	0–1	Salzburger AK 1914
SK Mittersill	0–0 (a.e.t.) (8–7 p)	Admira Dornbirn
SV Gmunden	2–1	Austria Klagenfurt
SV Güssing	1–1 (a.e.t.) (3–5 p)	1. Simmeringer SC
SV Spittal/Drau	0–3	Grazer AK
Slovan/HAC	0–2	SK Rapid Wien
VfB Hohenems	1–6	Linzer ASK
SK Vorwärts Steyr	1–1 (a.e.t.) (3–4 p)	SK VOEST Linz
SV Heid Stockerau	0–1	FC Admira/Wacker

== Third round ==
Team 1	Score	Team 2
11 March 1983
Linzer ASK	0–0 (a.e.t.) (3–1 p)	FK Austria Wien
12 March 1983
FC Admira/Wacker	2–0	Kapfenberger SV
Floridsdorfer AC	1–2	SK Rapid Wien
SSW Innsbruck	1–0	Union Wels
Salzburger AK 1914	0–2	1. Simmeringer SC
SK Sturm Graz	3–1	Grazer AK
SK VOEST Linz	5–1	SV Gmunden
First Vienna FC	2–0	SK Mittersill

== Quarter-finals ==
Team 1	Score	Team 2
22 March 1983
SK Sturm Graz	2–0	SK VOEST Linz
FC Admira/Wacker	5–1	1. Simmeringer SC
SK Rapid Wien	2–0	Linzer ASK
First Vienna FC	0–1	SSW Innsbruck

== Semi-finals ==
Team 1	Score	Team 2
29 March 1983
SK Rapid Wien	5–3 (a.e.t.)	SK Sturm Graz
SSW Innsbruck	0–0 (a.e.t.) (4–3 p)	FC Admira/Wacker

== Final ==
=== First leg ===
19 April 1983
19:00

SK Rapid Wien	3–0	SSW Innsbruck
Willfurth 39'; Krankl 55'; Keglevits 73'	Report

Gerhard Hanappi Stadium, Vienna
Attendance: 13,000
Referee: Helmut Kohl

=== Second leg ===
3 May 1983
19:00

SSW Innsbruck	0–5	SK Rapid Wien
	Report	Krankl 15', 25', 32' (pen.); Kienast 22'; Lainer 53'

Tivoli, Innsbruck
Attendance: 9,000
Referee: Adolf Mathias

SK Rapid Wien won 8–0 on aggregate.
