= Bručić =

Bručić is a surname. Notable people with the surname include:

- Karlo Bručić (born 1992), Croatian footballer
- Petar Bručić (born 1953), Croatian footballer
