= Soppo (surname) =

Soppo is a Cameroonian surname. Notable people with the surname include:

- Alphonse Soppo (born 1985), Cameroonian footballer
- Steve Thibaut Ekedi Soppo (born 1991), Cameroonian footballer

== See also ==
- Soppo, place in Cameroon
