= Allofs =

Allofs is a surname. Notable people with the surname include:

- Klaus Allofs (born 1956), German general manager
- Thomas Allofs (born 1959), German footballer
