= Peter Burgstaller =

Austrian footballer

Personal information
- Full name: Peter Burgstaller
- Date of birth: 13 February 1964
- Place of birth: Skt. Lorenz bei Mondsee, Austria
- Date of death: 23 November 2007 (aged 43)
- Place of death: Durban, South Africa
- Position: Goalkeeper

Senior career*
Years	Team	Apps	(Gls)
1983–1985	Favoritner AC	41	(0)
1985–1986	Wacker Innsbruck	7	(0)
1986–1987	Grazer AK	1	(0)
1987–1988	First Vienna FC	0	(0)
1987–1988	VfB Mödling	15	(0)
1988–1991	Austria Salzburg	12	(0)
1991–1992	SV Ried	14	(0)
1992–1993	Austria Salzburg	0	(0)
- * Club domestic league appearances and goals

Peter Burgstaller (13 February 1964 – 23 November 2007) was an Austrian football goalkeeper.

== Club career ==
He played for Favoritner AC (until 1984), Wacker Innsbruck (1984–1986), Grazer AK (1986–1987), VfB Mödling (1987–1988), Austria Salzburg (1988–1991), SV Ried (1991–1992) and finally a second spell at Austria Salzburg before retiring from the game in 1993.

== Retirement ==
After retiring from the game, Burgstaller coached lower division side FC Puch during the 1995–96 season, and later founded an event agency in Salzburg.

== Death ==
Burgstaller was shot and killed on a golf course in Durban, South Africa on 23 November 2007. Police suspect the murder was the result of a robbery, as Burgstaller's mobile phone and golfing equipment were missing at the scene of the crime. At the time of his murder, delegates were attending the World Cup qualifying draw in nearby Durban, South Africa.

Three men were arrested after the murder. On 30 October 2009 two of the arrested men were convicted of murder and of robbery with aggravating circumstances. They received lengthy prison sentences.
