= Alphonse Soppo =

Cameroonian footballer (born 1985)

Personal information
- Full name: Alphonse Denis Soppo
- Date of birth: 15 May 1985 (age 41)
- Place of birth: Yaoundé, Cameroon
- Height: 1.82 m (5 ft 11 1/2 in)
- Position: Midfielder

Team information
- Current team: Favoritner AC

Senior career*
Years	Team	Apps	(Gls)
2008–2012	Nistru Otaci	103	(2)
2012–2013	Costuleni	11	(0)
2013–2015	Dacia Chișinău	30	(0)
2015	Dinamo-Auto Tiraspol	11	(0)
2015–2019	Rudar Pljevlja	106	(3)
2019–2020	Zeta	25	(1)
2021-	Favoritner AC	136	(0)
- * Club domestic league appearances and goals as of 28 June 2026

Alphonse Soppo (born 15 May 1985, in Yaoundé, Cameroon) is a Cameroonian football midfielder who plays for Austrian club Favoritner AC.

== Club statistics ==
- Total matches played in Moldavian First League: 144 matches – 2 goals
