= Robert Frind =

Austrian footballer

Personal information
- Full name: Robert Frind
- Date of birth: 2 December 1963 (age 62)
- Place of birth: Vienna, Austria
- Position: Defender

Senior career*
| Years | Team | Apps | (Gls) |
| 1981–1992 | Austria Wien | 150 | (7) |

International career^{‡}
| 1987–1988 | Austria | 5 | (0) |
- * Club domestic league appearances and goals as of 3 November 2009 ‡ National team caps and goals as of 3 November 2009

Robert Frind (born 2 December 1963) is a retired football defender from Austria. During his club career, Frind played for Austria Wien. He also made 5 appearances for the Austria national team.
