= Leopold Rotter =

Austrian footballer

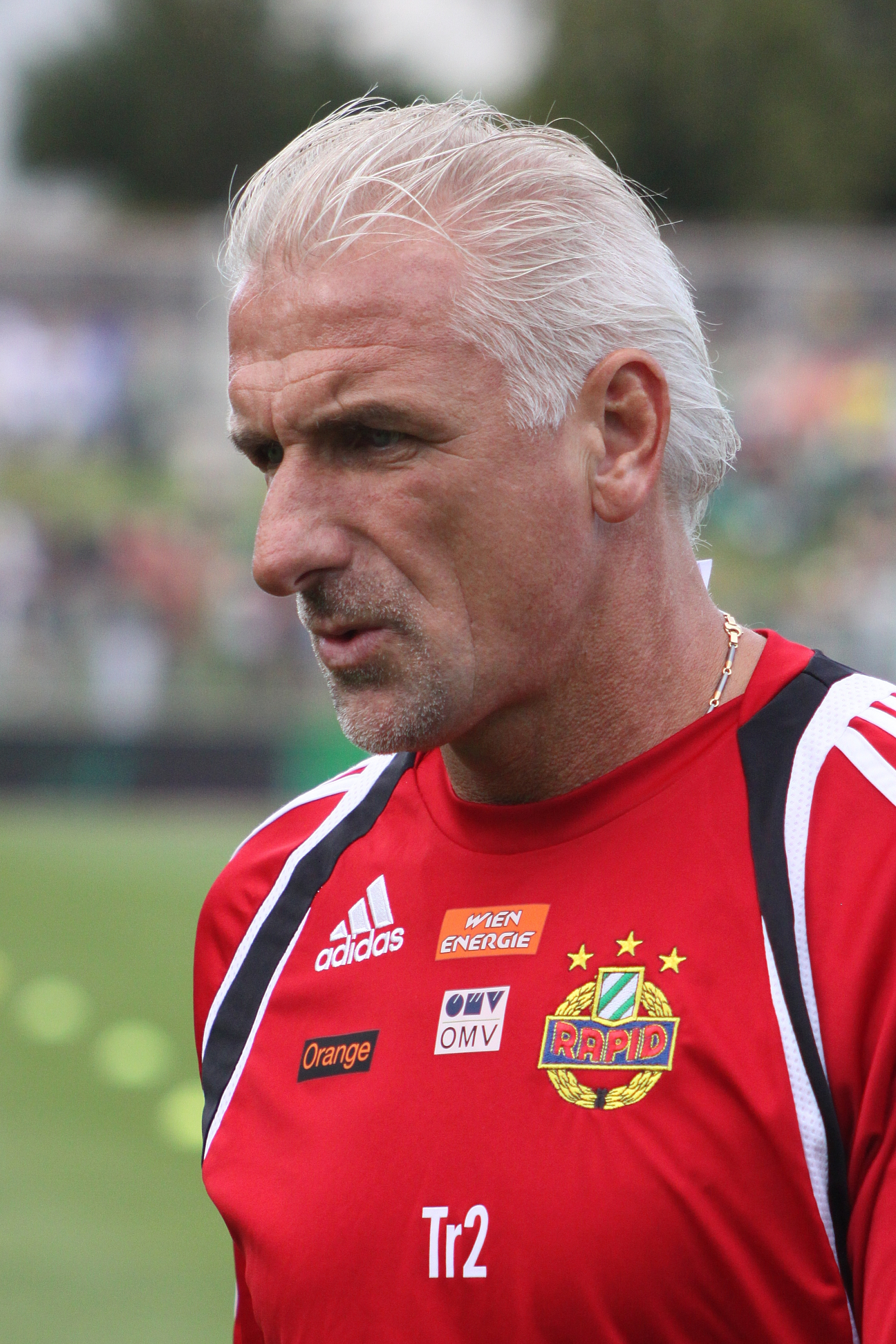

Personal information
- Date of birth: 14 September 1964 (age 62)
- Place of birth: Vienna, Austria
- Height: 1.87 m (6 ft 2 in)
- Position: Defender

Senior career*
Years	Team	Apps	(Gls)
- Rapid Wien
- First Vienna FC
- VSE St. Pölten
- SV Schwechat
- FC St. Veit

International career
1991–1992	Austria	6	(0)
- * Club domestic league appearances and goals

Leopold Rotter (born 14 September 1964) is an Austrian former professional footballer who played as a defender. He made six appearances for the Austria national team from 1991 to 1992.
