= Anatoli Zinchenko =

Russian footballer (born 1949)

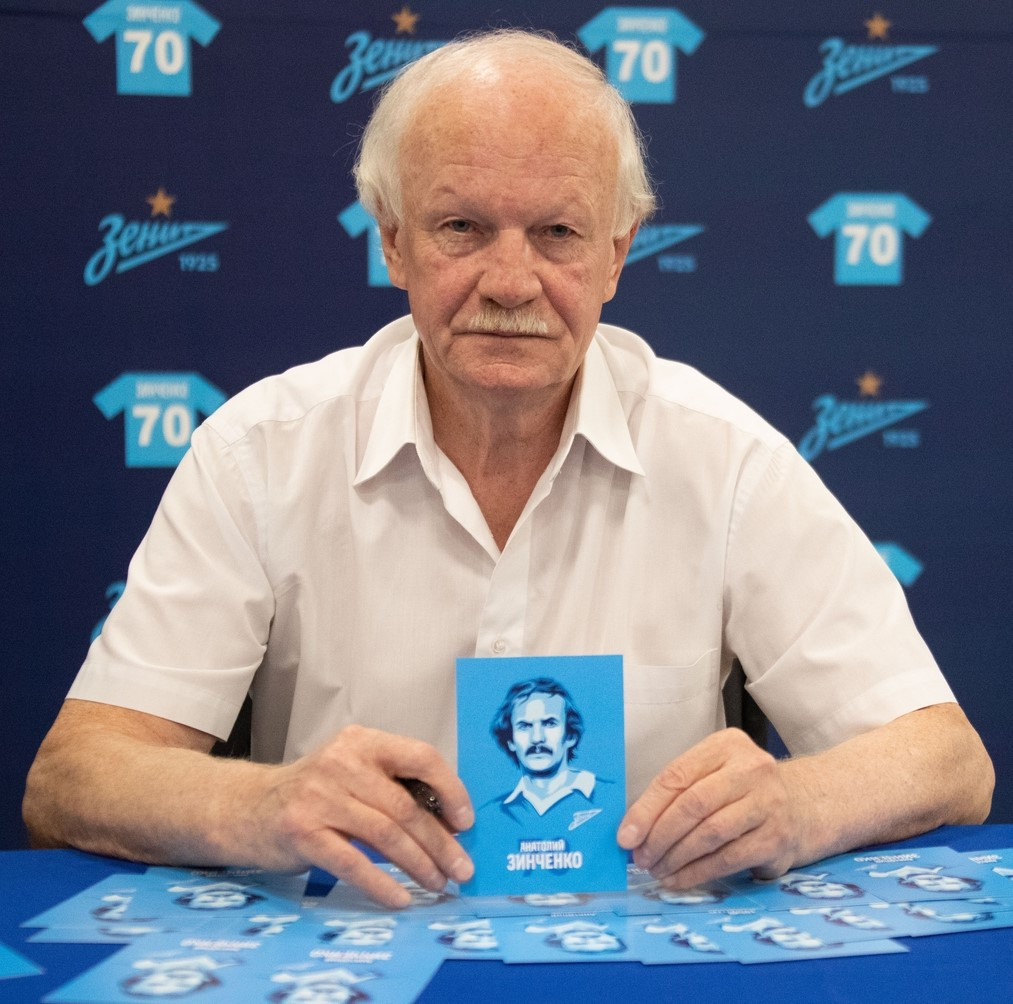
- Anatoli Zinchenko in 2019.

Personal information
- Full name: Anatoli Alekseyevich Zinchenko
- Date of birth: 8 August 1949 (age 77)
- Place of birth: Stalinsk, USSR
- Height: 1.82 m (5 ft 11 1/2 in)
- Position: Striker

Senior career*
Years	Team	Apps	(Gls)
1967–1968	Traktor Volgograd	26	(4)
1968–1971	FC SKA Rostov-on-Don	68	(8)
1972–1975	Zenit Leningrad	99	(23)
1976–1978	Dynamo Leningrad	58	(23)
1979–1980	Zenit Leningrad	26	(2)
1980–1983	SK Rapid Wien	45	(6)

International career
1969–1973	USSR	3	(0)

Managerial career
- ?: Klimovets Leningrad
- ?: Krasny Treugolnik Leningrad
- 1986: Stroitel Cherepovets
- 1988–1989: Dynamo Leningrad
- 1990–1992: Zenit St. Petersburg (assistant)
- 1993: Zenit-2 St. Petersburg
- 1994: FC Erzi Petrozavodsk
- * Club domestic league appearances and goals

Anatoli Alekseyevich Zinchenko (Russian: Анатолий Алексеевич Зинченко) (born 8 August 1949, in Stalinsk) is a retired Soviet football player and Russian coach. He is best known for being the first Soviet football player to play for a Western European professional club. His transfer to SK Rapid Wien was facilitated by Austrian communist journalist Kurt Chastka. Because Soviet footballers were officially amateurs, Zichenko was formally employed as an equipment technician at the Soviet embassy while playing for Rapid. His salary from Rapid was sent to the Soviet government.

== International career ==
Zinchenko made his debut for USSR on 24 September 1969 in a friendly against Yugoslavia. He was capped three times in total.

== Honours ==
- Soviet Cup finalist: 1969, 1971
- Austrian Football Bundesliga winner: 1982, 1983
- Austrian Cup winner: 1983
