= Vukan Perović =

Montenegrin footballer

Personal information
- Full name: Vukan Perović
- Date of birth: 18 October 1952 (age 74)
- Place of birth: Nikšić, FPR Yugoslavia
- Position: Striker

Senior career*
Years	Team	Apps	(Gls)
1975–1977	Partizan	28	(8)
1977–1978	Adanaspor	16	(4)
1978	Tulsa Roughnecks	8	(0)
1978–1983	Rapid Vienna	52	(22)
1980–1981	→ Elche (loan)	14	(9)
Total		118	(43)
- * Club domestic league appearances and goals

Vukan Perović (Cyrillic: Вукан Перовић; born 18 October 1952) is a Montenegrin retired professional footballer who played as a striker.

== Career ==
Perović began playing professional football in the Yugoslav First League for FK Partizan. After spending two seasons with the club, he moved to Turkey where he would play with Adanaspor for one season. Next, he had a brief stint in the United States with the Tulsa Roughnecks.

Perović joined Austrian side Rapid Vienna in 1978, scoring 21 goals in 42 league matches during his two seasons with the club. Rapid allowed Perović to go on trial with Spanish club Real Betis, but they ultimately loaned him to Segunda División side Elche in December 1980. He scored eight goals in twelve games for Elche, but the club did not exercise an option to purchase his contract. He returned to Rapid for the 1982–83 season.
