= Ewald Türmer =

Austrian footballer (born 1960)

Personal information
- Date of birth: 22 April 1960 (age 66)
- Place of birth: St. Andrä im Lavanttal, Austria
- Height: 1.79 m (5 ft 10 1/2 in)
- Position: Midfielder

Senior career*
Years	Team	Apps	(Gls)
1976–1977	WAC St. Andrä		
1977–1984	Austria Klagenfurt		
1984–1987	FK Austria Wien	66	(8)
1987–1990	SK Sturm Graz	75	(9)
1990–1991	Austria Klagenfurt		
1991–1992	Wolfsberger AC		

International career
1984–1986	Austria	8	(0)
- * Club domestic league appearances and goals

Ewald Türmer (born 22 April 1960) is a retired football midfielder from Austria.

During his club career, Türmer played for WAC St. Andrä, Austria Klagenfurt, FK Austria Wien, SK Sturm Graz and Wolfsberger AC. He also appeared eight times for the Austria national team.
