= Helmut Hofmann =

German boxer

Personal information
- Nationality: German
- Born: 14 November 1925; Friedrichsthal, Germany
- Died: 21 August 2017 (aged 91)

Sport
- Sport: Boxing

Helmut Hofmann (14 November 1925 – 21 August 2017) was a German boxer. He competed in the men's flyweight event at the 1952 Summer Olympics, representing Saar.
