= Bernd Krauss =

Austrian footballer and manager

Personal information
- Date of birth: 8 May 1957 (age 69)
- Place of birth: Dortmund, West Germany
- Height: 1.85 m (6 ft 1 in)
- Position: Defender

Youth career
- 1971–1976: BSV Schüren

Senior career*
Years	Team	Apps	(Gls)
1976–1977	Borussia Dortmund	1	(0)
1977–1983	Rapid Wien	191	(18)
1983–1990	Borussia Mönchengladbach	167	(8)
Total		359	(26)

International career
1981–1984	Austria	22	(0)

Managerial career
- 1988–1989: SC Kapellen
- 1989–1990: Borussia Mönchengladbach II
- 1990–1991: 1. FC Köln II
- 1991–1996: Borussia Mönchengladbach
- 1997–1999: Real Sociedad
- 2000: Borussia Dortmund
- 2001–2002: Mallorca
- 2002: Aris
- 2004: Admira Wacker
- 2005: Pegah Gilan
- 2006: Tenerife
- 2007: SK Schwadorf
- 2012: ÉS Sahel
- * Club domestic league appearances and goals

Bernd Krauss (born 8 May 1957) is a retired football player and manager. Born in West Germany, he represented Austria at international level.

His most recent spell he had as technical director and head coach of Tunisian club Étoile Sportive du Sahel in 2012.

== Club career ==
Born in Dortmund, Krauss started his professional career at local outfit Borussia Dortmund but limited chances there made him move to Austrian Bundesliga side Rapid Wien in 1977. The move proved to be successful, winning the league title (twice) and the domestic cup. He only returned to Germany in 1983 to join Borussia Mönchengladbach where he finished his playing career and took up a coaching post.

== International career ==
The German-born Krauss was tempted to become an Austrian citizen when playing at Rapid Wien and joined Austria's national team set-up. He made his debut for Austria in 1981 and was a participant at the 1982 FIFA World Cup. He earned 22 caps, no goals scored – however, he did score an own goal against West Germany in a game on 29 April 1981 that ended in a 2–0 loss. He already played his final international match in 1984, after he left Austria to play in his native West Germany again.

== Coaching career ==
Krauss started his coaching career at the German club SC Kapellen (1988–89), before he was called up to manage the amateur teams of Borussia Mönchengladbach (1989–90) and 1. FC Köln (1990). In 1991, he became the assistant coach at Mönchengladbach, and then from 6 November 1992 to 7 December 1996 he was the appointed head coach of the club. In 1995, he achieved great success in winning the DFB-Pokal.

The late 90s were the most successful years in the coaching era of Bernd Krauss. 1997–1999 he managed the Spanish first-division team of Real Sociedad. In 2000, he shortly came back to Germany to take over Borussia Dortmund, succeeding Michael Skibbe. It turned out to be a big mistake, as he was sacked after two months. Krauss then got back to Spain, where he coached RCD Mallorca (2001).

In the next few years Krauss became a globetrotter, managing teams in Greece (Aris, 2002), Austria (VfB Admira Wacker Mödling, 2004), United Arab Emirates and Iran (Pegah Gilan, 2005). From April to December 2006 he return to Spain, where he managed CD Tenerife.

In August 2007 he was appointed manager of Austrian SK Schwadorf, replacing Attila Sekerlioglu. On 6 December the same year he was fired, placing only one point ahead of the relegation zone in the Austrian Second Division.

In January 2012, Krauss was appointed general manager of Tunesian Étoile Sportive du Sahel then the head coach of the same team. In March 2012, he reportedly returned to his initial position of youth technical director as Faouzi Benzarti took up the post of the head coach of Étoile. However, he denied the change of positions and left the club.

== Honours ==
=== Player ===
- Austrian Bundesliga: 1981–82, 1982–83
- Austrian Cup: 1983

=== Manager ===
==== Borussia Mönchengladbach ====
- DFB-Pokal: 1994–95
