= Johann Dihanich =

Austrian footballer

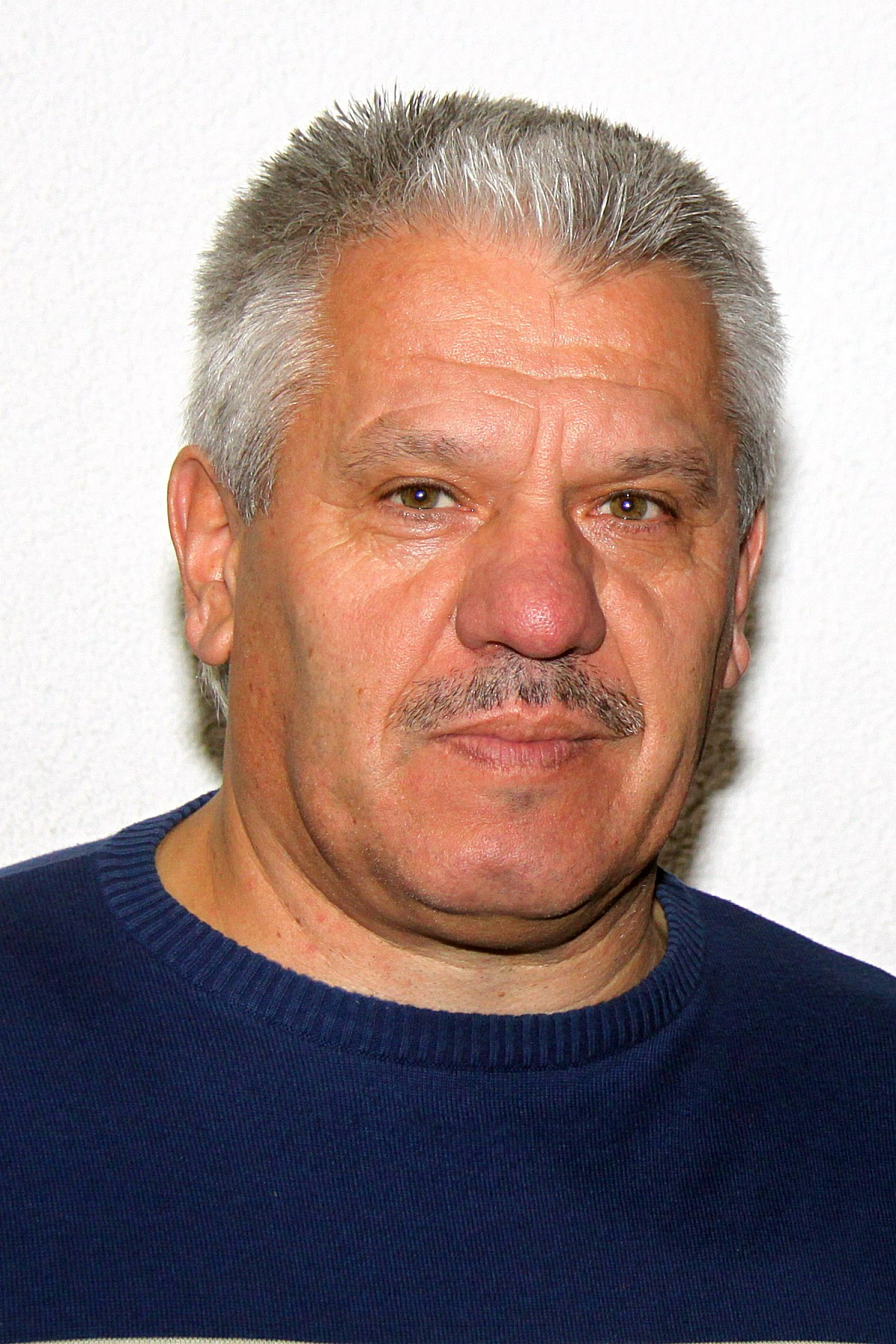

Personal information
- Full name: Johann Dihanich
- Date of birth: 24 October 1958 (age 68)
- Place of birth: Eisenstadt, Austria
- Height: 1.74 m (5 ft 9 in)
- Position: Midfielder

Youth career
- ASK Klingenbach

Senior career*
Years	Team	Apps	(Gls)
1978–1983	Austria Wien	145	(8)
1983–1984	SS Wacker Innsbruck	29	(4)
1984–1987	Austria Wien	79	(4)
1987–1989	Grazer AK	69	(7)
1989–1991	VÖEST Linz		
1991–1992	Favoritner AC	34	(4)

International career
1980–1984	Austria	10	(0)
- * Club domestic league appearances and goals

Johann Dihanich (born 24 October 1958, in Eisenstadt) is a retired Austrian football player.

== Club career ==
A Rapid Wien fan by origin, Hansi Dihanich started his professional career at city rivals Austria Wien and played 8 seasons for them, split in two periods by a season at SS Wacker Innsbruck. In 1987, he joined Grazer AK, before moving to Second Division VÖEST Linz and finishing his career at FavAC.

== International career ==
He made his debut for Austria in October 1980 against Hungary and earned 10 caps in total. He was a member of Austria's squad at the 1982 FIFA World Cup, but did not play in any of their games.

After his playing career, he became an assistant-coach at Austria and GAK and head coach at some lower league sides.

== Honours ==
- Austrian Football Bundesliga (5):
  - 1979, 1980, 1981, 1985, 1986
- Austrian Cup (3):
  - 1980, 1982, 1986
