= Favoritner AC =

Austrian football club, based in Vienna

FavAC
- Full name: Favoritner Athletik Club
- Founded: 1 August 1910; 116 years ago
- Ground: FavAC-Platz, Favoriten, Vienna
- Capacity: 5000
- Chairman: Franz Leopold
- Manager: Rozhgar Kadir
- League: Austrian Regional League East
- 2025/26: Regionalliga East, 13th of 17
- Website: https://www.fav.ac
Home colours	Away colours

The Favoritner Athletik Club, or FavAC for short, is an Austrian football club from the Viennese Favoriten district and currently plays in the third tier, the Austrian Regional League East. The club's popularity drastically rose during their most recent two-year spell in the top division between 1983 and 1985. Their colours are red and black.

It should not be confused with Favoritner Sports Club, a club that was active in the highest Austrian league several years before, nor with Favoritner SK Blau-Weiß which also played in the top division.

== History ==
The club was founded in 1910 as the football section of the bowling club Kegelklub Favorit as Favorit Athletic Club. On 21 December 1910 the club was admitted to a meeting of the Austrian Football Association and assigned to the Vienna Second Division. Before that, the club was already entered into the register of associations on 1 August 1910, under the name Favoritner Athletics Sports Club, or Favoritner ASC for short. After a few years in 2nd Division and a temporary spell in the league of the labour movement, the VAFÖ (Vereinigung der Amateur-Fußballvereine Österreichs), Favoritner AC played in the years 1936 to 1938 for the first time in the highest Austrian league.

After the relegation in 1938, the top flight could only be achieved between 1983 and 1985. However these two seasons brought the FavAC a great popularity in Vienna. During the course of the 1990s, the club competed several times in the second league, ending in 4th place in the 1992/93 season and 6th in the 1996/96 season. Then in the early 2000s the club fell all the way down to the fifth tier of Austrian football.

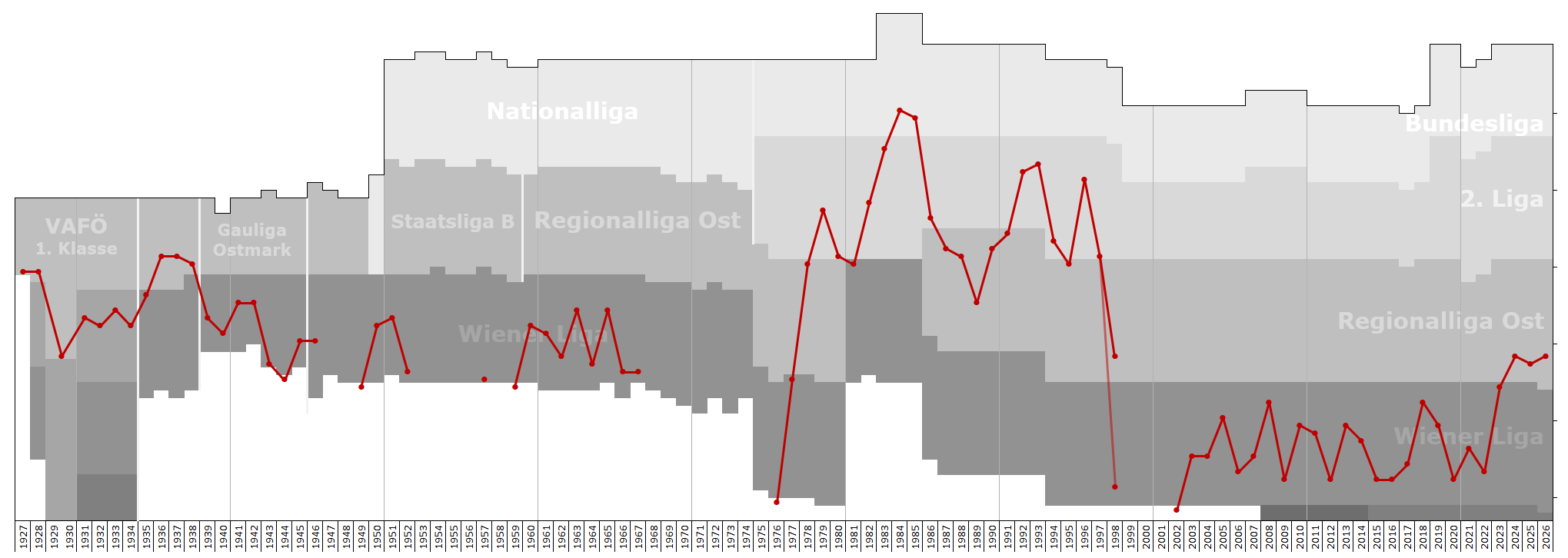
Historical chart of the club's league performance

Since 2010/11 the club plays in Wiener Stadtliga, the fourth-highest tier.

=== Current squad ===
As of 7 April, 2026

Note: Flags indicate national team as defined under FIFA eligibility rules; some limited exceptions apply. Players may hold more than one non-FIFA nationality.

No.	Pos.	Nation	Player
1	GK	AUT	Dennis Verwüster
2	MF	AUT	Cihat Kocak
4	DF	CMR	Alphonse Soppo
5	MF	KOS	Pjeter Lekaj
6	DF	SRB	Boris Grozdić
7	MF	TOG	Mansour Kerime
8	DF	AUT	Michael Valtchev
9	FW	FRA	Brooklyn Barataud
10	MF	AUT	Almer Softic
11	MF	POL	Patryk Cież
12	MF	FRA	Kenny Schincariol

No.	Pos.	Nation	Player
13	MF	GER	Mateja Nedeljkovic
14	MF	AUT	Can Özdemir
15	DF	AUT	Viktor Minic
16	FW	AUT	Aris Stogiannidis
17	MF	AUT	Aleksa Markovic
18	MF	HUN	Áron Mester
19	MF	AUT	Marko Crnjak
20	FW	AUT	Faris Kavaz
21	DF	MKD	Leon Najdovski
22	DF	CRO	Matej Milićević
33	DF	AUT	Corvin Aussenegg
35	GK	SRB	Marko Stefanović

== Honours ==
=== Women ===
- Austrian Women's Champions: 1972/73

=== Men ===
- 2 × Vienna City League Winners: 1977, 1981
- 2 × semi-finalists of the Austrian Cup : 1992, 1993
- 1 × Winner of the Wiener Stadthalle Tournament : 1993

Other achievements:

- 1934/35: Promotion to the State League
- 1935–1938: Granted State League membership
- 1950/51: Winners of the National League
- 1948–49: 2nd Division North Winners
- 1976/77: Wiener Stadtliga Winners
- 1977/78: Promotion to the 2nd Bundesliga
- 1982/83: Promotion to the 1st Bundesliga
- 1983/84: relegation from the Bundesliga
- 1994/95: Regionalliga Ost Winners
- 1995: 6th in the 2nd Bundesliga

== Notable players ==
- Zoran Barišić
- Peter Burgstaller
- Dietmar Constantini
- Reinhard Kienast
- Tomislav Kocijan
- Mario Majstorović
- Andreas Ogris
- Hans Pirkner
- Josef Sara
- Robert Sara
- Fred Schaub
- Peter Stöger
- Gerhard Bronner (as a youth player)
