= Antonín Panenka =

Czech footballer (born 1948)

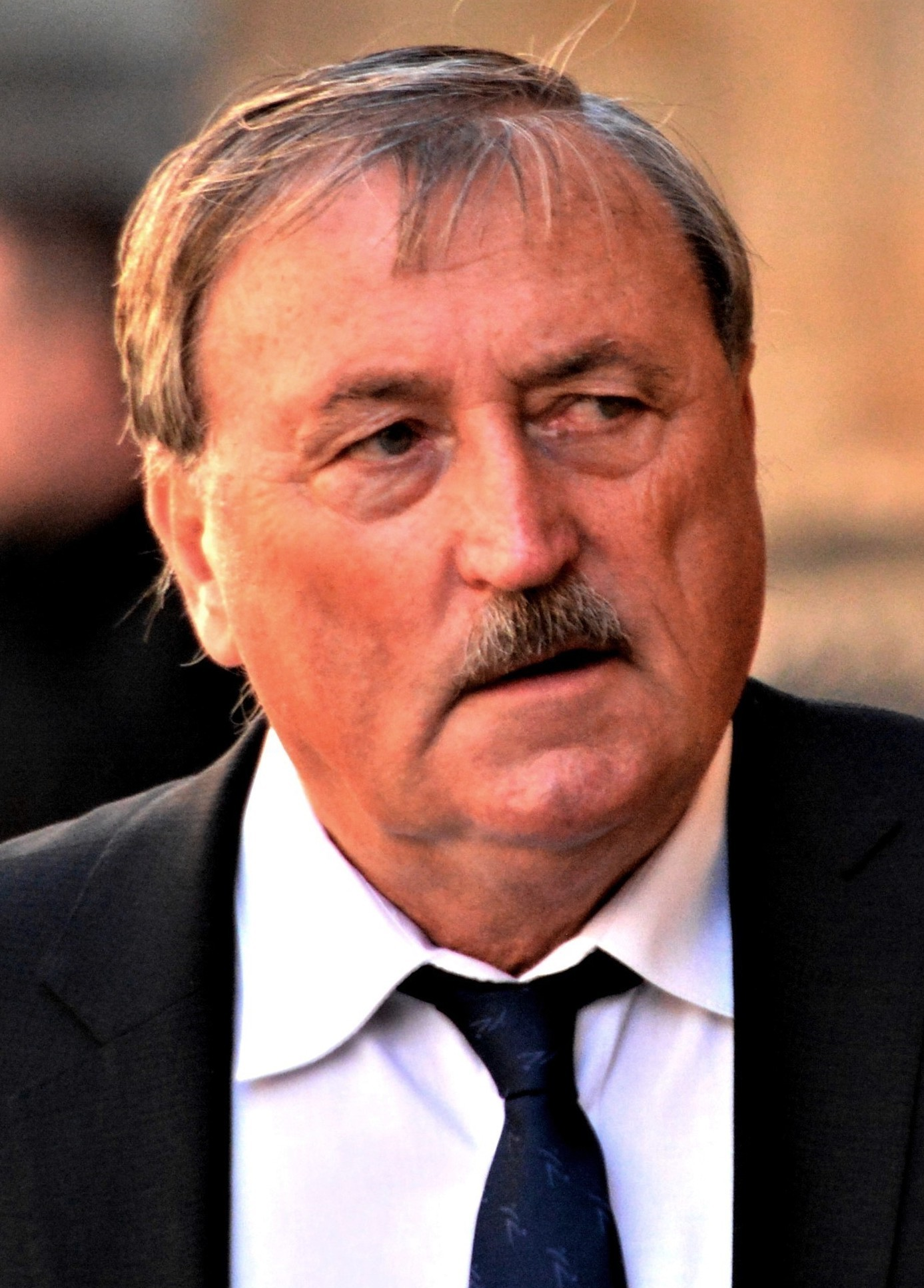
- Panenka in 2019

Personal information
- Full name: Antonín Panenka
- Date of birth: 2 December 1948 (age 77)
- Place of birth: Prague, Czechoslovakia
- Height: 1.78 m (5 ft 10 in)
- Position: Attacking midfielder

Team information
- Current team: Bohemians Prague (chairman)

Youth career
- 1958–1967: Bohemians Prague

Senior career*
Years	Team	Apps	(Gls)
1967–1981	Bohemians Prague	230	(76)
1981–1985	Rapid Wien	127	(63)
1985–1987	VSE St. Pölten	50	(31)
1987–1989	SK Slovan Wien	54	(25)
1989–1991	ASV Hohenau	8	(6)
1991–1993	Kleinwiesendorf		
Total		469	(201)

International career
1973–1982	Czechoslovakia	59	(17)
Medal record
Men's football
Representing Czechoslovakia
UEFA European Championship
Winner	1976 Yugoslavia
- * Club domestic league appearances and goals

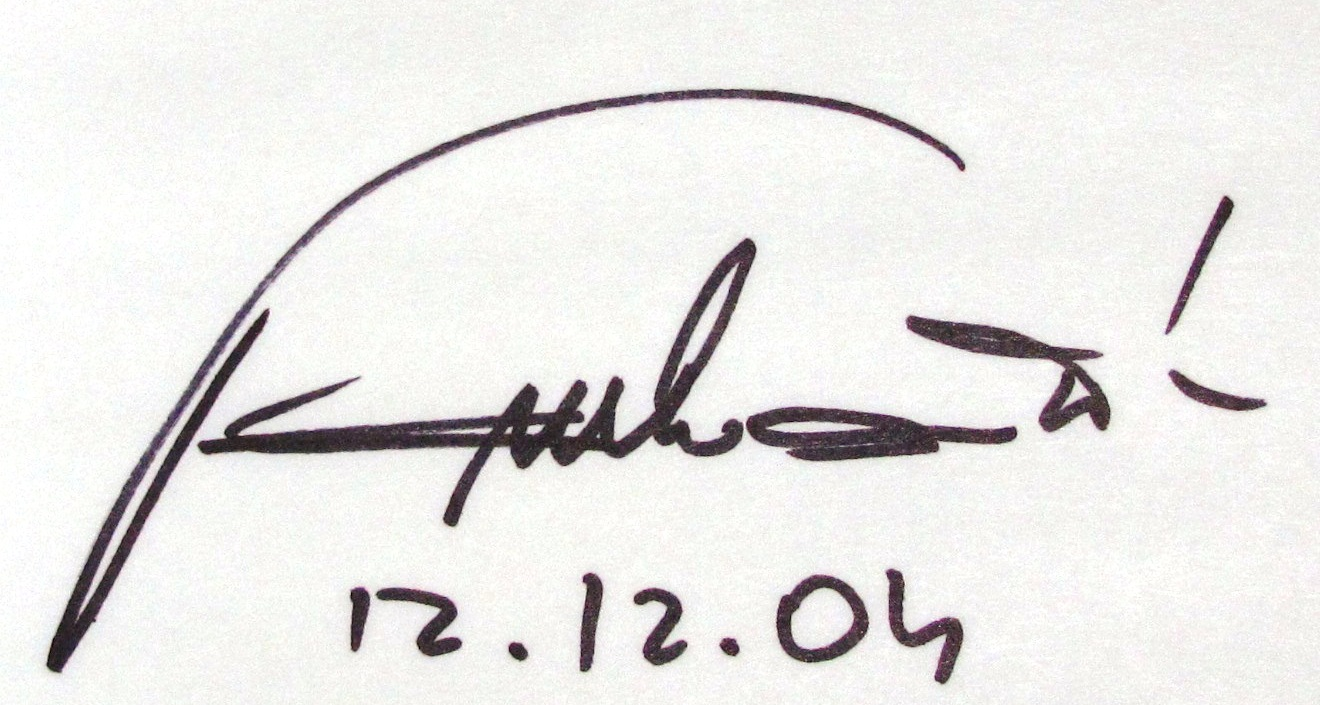
Signature of Antonín Panenka (2004)

Antonín Panenka (born 2 December 1948) is a Czech former professional footballer who played as an attacking midfielder. He spent most of his career at Czechoslovak club Bohemians Prague before having spells with various Austrian clubs including Rapid Wien. Panenka won UEFA Euro 1976 with Czechoslovakia and gained recognition for his winning penalty kick in the shoot-out of the final against West Germany where he scored with a softly-chipped ball up the middle of the goal as the goalkeeper dived away. This style of penalty is now known as a panenka. In 1980, he won Czechoslovak Footballer of the Year and his team finished third at Euro 1980.

== Club career ==
An attacking midfielder known for the quality of his passing and his free kicks, Panenka played for Bohemians Prague for most of his career, joining the club in 1967. He was named Czechoslovak Footballer of the Year in 1980. In 1981, Panenka left Bohemians for Austrian club Rapid Wien, where he won two Bundesliga titles and an Austrian Cup. In 1985, Rapid reached the UEFA Cup Winners' Cup final; Panenka played as a substitute, but his side lost 3–1 to Everton. Later that year, Panenka moved to VSE St. Pölten and played two more seasons before moving into the lower leagues in Austria, playing from 1987 to 1989 for Slovan Vienna, from 1989 to 1991 for ASV Hohenau and from 1991 to 1993 for Kleinwiesendorf.

== Panenka penalty ==
External videos
- Panenka penalty. Antonín Panenka. 1976. European Champions.

Panenka came to international prominence playing for Czechoslovakia at UEFA Euro 1976, where his country reached the final, facing West Germany. After extra time, the match finished 2–2, and so the first penalty shoot-out in a European Championship final ensued. The first seven kicks were converted until West Germany's fourth penalty taker, Uli Hoeneß, ballooned his shot over the bar. With the score 4–3, Panenka stepped up to take the fifth Czechoslovak penalty, to win the match under immense pressure. He feigned shooting to the side of the goal, causing German goalkeeper Sepp Maier to dive to his left, and then gently chipped the ball into the middle of the net. The sheer cheek of the goal led a watching French journalist to dub Panenka "a poet"; his winning kick is one of the most famous ever, making Panenka's name synonymous with that particular style of penalty kick.

Since 1976 there have been numerous attempts to emulate Panenka, both successfully and others unsuccessfully, at every level of the sporting pyramid across the world, including in critical match winning moments such as international cup finals.

== Post-playing career ==
Following his career, Panenka worked as a president at former club Bohemians 1905. On 7 October 2020, the club confirmed that Panenka had been admitted to hospital and was in intensive care after testing positive for the novel coronavirus. By mid-October, Panenka's condition had improved and he was discharged to continue his recovery at home.

== Career statistics ==
=== International ===
Appearances and goals by national team and year
National team	Year	Apps	Goals
Czechoslovakia	1973	2	0
Czechoslovakia	1974	6	1
Czechoslovakia	1975	3	3
Czechoslovakia	1976	8	4
Czechoslovakia	1977	3	1
Czechoslovakia	1978	6	1
Czechoslovakia	1979	9	3
Czechoslovakia	1980	14	1
Czechoslovakia	1981	5	1
Czechoslovakia	1982	3	2
Total		59	17

Scores and results list Czechoslovakia's goal tally first, score column indicates score after each Panenka goal.

List of international goals scored by Antonín Panenka
No.	Date	Venue	Opponent	Score	Result	Competition	Ref.
1	27 April 1974	Stadion Letná, Prague, Czechoslovakia	France	3–3	3–3	Friendly	
2	20 April 1975	Stadion Letná, Prague, Czechoslovakia	Cyprus	1–0	4–0	UEFA Euro 1976 qualification	
3	20 April 1975	Stadion Letná, Prague, Czechoslovakia	Cyprus	2–0	4–0	UEFA Euro 1976 qualification	
4	20 April 1975	Stadion Letná, Prague, Czechoslovakia	Cyprus	3–0	4–0	UEFA Euro 1976 qualification	
5	24 April 1976	Tehelné pole, Bratislava, Czechoslovakia	Soviet Union	2–0	2–0	UEFA Euro 1976	
6	22 September 1976	Stadionul August 23, Bucharest,	Romania	1–0	1–1	Friendly	
7	6 October 1976	Stadion Letná, Prague, Czechoslovakia	Romania	1–1	3–2	Friendly	
8	13 October 1976	Stadion Letná, Prague, Czechoslovakia	Scotland	1–0	2-0	1978 FIFA World Cup qualification	
9	23 March 1977	Stadion Letná, Prague, Czechoslovakia	Greece	1–0	4–0	Friendly	
10	8 November 1978	Tehelné pole, Bratislava, Czechoslovakia	Italy	1–0	3–0	Friendly	
11	4 April 1979	Tehelné pole, Bratislava, Czechoslovakia	France	1–0	2–0	UEFA Euro 1980 qualification	
12	12 September 1979	Sóstói Stadion, Székesfehérvár, Hungary	Hungary	1–2	1–2	Friendly	
13	24 November 1979	Great Strahov Stadium, Prague, Czechoslovakia	Luxembourg	1–0	4–0	UEFA Euro 1980 qualification	
14	14 June 1980	Stadio Olimpico, Rome, Italy	Greece	1–0	3–1	UEFA Euro 1980	
15	27 May 1981	Tehelné pole, Bratislava, Czechoslovakia	Iceland	2–0	6–1	1982 FIFA World Cup qualification	
16	17 June 1982	Estadio José Zorrilla, Valladolid, Spain	Kuwait	1–0	1–1	1982 FIFA World Cup	
17	24 June 1982	Estadio José Zorrilla, Valladolid, Spain	France	1–1	1–1	1982 FIFA World Cup	

== Honours ==
Rapid Wien

- Austrian Bundesliga: 1981–82, 1982–83
- Austrian Cup: 1982–83, 1983–84, 1984–85

Czechoslovakia

- UEFA European Championship: 1976

Individual

- UEFA European Championship Team of the Tournament: 1976
- Czechoslovak Footballer of the Year: 1980
- ADN Eastern European Footballer of the Season: 1980
- European Cup Winners' Cup Top Scorer: 1984–85
- Golden Foot Legends Award: 2014
