= Karl Brauneder =

Austrian footballer

Personal information
- Full name: Karl Brauneder
- Date of birth: 13 March 1960 (age 66)
- Place of birth: Vösendorf, Austria
- Position: Defender

Senior career*
Years	Team	Apps	(Gls)
1978–1983	Wiener Sport-Club	0	(0)
1983–1995	Rapid Wien	262	(21)
1991–1992	→ Stahl Linz (loan)	26	(1)
1994–1995	VfB Mödling	0	(0)
1996–1998	ASK Klingenbach	0	(0)

International career
1982–1988	Austria	19	(1)

Managerial career
- 2008–2010: 1. Simmeringer SC
- * Club domestic league appearances and goals

Karl Brauneder (born 13 March 1960 in Vösendorf, Austria) is a retired football defender. During his club career, Brauneder played for Wiener Sport-Club, Rapid Wien and Stahl Linz.
