= Johann Pregesbauer =

Austrian footballer

Personal information
- Full name: Johann Pregesbauer
- Date of birth: 8 June 1958 (age 68)
- Place of birth: Austria
- Height: 1.81 m (5 ft 11 in)
- Position: Defender

Senior career*
Years	Team	Apps	(Gls)
1974–1986	Rapid Wien	184	(13)

International career
1980–1984	Austria	10	(0)
- * Club domestic league appearances and goals

Johann Pregesbauer (born 8 June 1958) is a retired football defender from Austria. Pregesbauer spent his whole club career with Rapid Wien and was also in the Austria squad for the 1982 FIFA World Cup.
