= Petar Bručić =

Croatian footballer

Personal information
- Full name: Petar Bručić
- Date of birth: 28 June 1953 (age 73)
- Place of birth: Jarmina, FPR Yugoslavia
- Position: Midfielder

Senior career*
Years	Team	Apps	(Gls)
?–1975	Dinamo Vinkovci		
1975–1982	Dinamo Zagreb	172	(14)
1982–1987	Rapid Wien	118	(6)
1987–1990	Wiener Sport-Club	75	(3)
- * Club domestic league appearances and goals

Petar Bručić (born 28 June, 1953) is a Croatian retired football midfielder who played for several Croatian and foreign football clubs, notably Rapid Wien in the Austrian Bundesliga and Dinamo Zagreb in the HNL.
