= Rudi Weinhofer =

Austrian footballer

Personal information
- Full name: Rudolf Weinhofer
- Date of birth: 7 May 1962 (age 64)
- Place of birth: Austria
- Position: Midfielder

Senior career*
Years	Team	Apps	(Gls)
1980–1988	Rapid Vienna	158	(11)
1988	First Vienna FC	10	(0)
1988–1990	St. Pölten	43	(1)
1990–1991	Stockerau		

International career
1986–1987	Austria	4	(0)
- * Club domestic league appearances and goals

Rudolf Weinhofer (born 7 May 1962) is an Austrian former footballer who played at both professional and international levels as a midfielder.

== Career ==
=== Professional career ===
Weinhofer began his professional career in 1980 with Rapid Vienna, and made over 150 league appearances for the club over the next eight seasons. During the Second Round of the 1984–85 European Cup Winners' Cup, in a match against Scottish side Celtic, Weinhofer claimed to have been hit and injured by an object thrown by Celtic's fans; UEFA ordered the match to be replayed. Rapid progressed at Celtic's expense, and eventually reached the 1985 European Cup Winners' Cup Final – a match which Weinhofer played in – before losing to Everton.

After leaving Rapid in 1988, Weinhofer later played for First Vienna FC, St. Pölten, and Stockerau.

=== International career ===
Weinhofer earned four caps for the Austrian national side between 1986 and 1987.

== After football ==
From 2009, Weinhofer worked as a benefits claim checker for the Austrian Health Service.
