= Heribert Weber =

Austrian footballer and manager

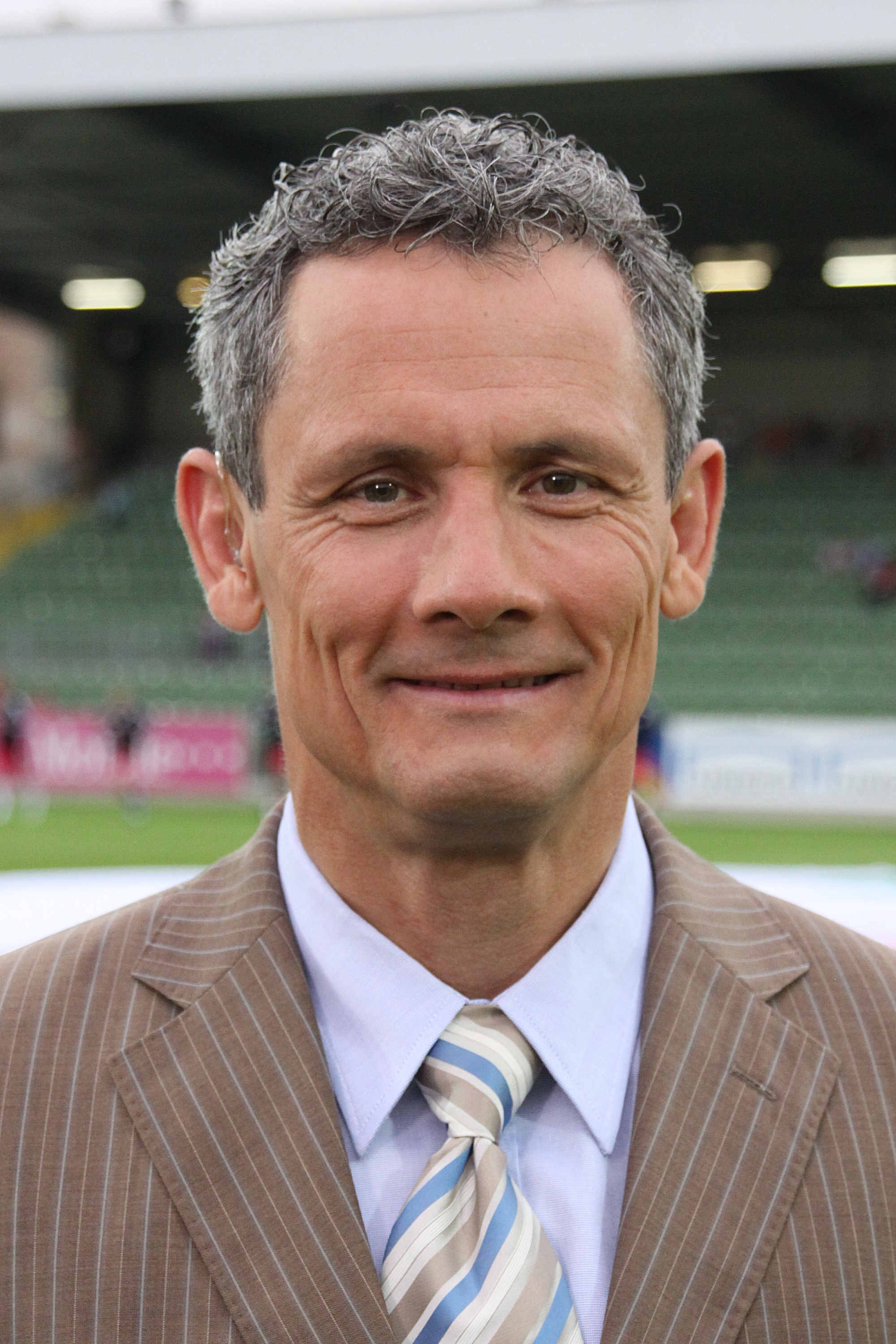
- Weber as the sporting director for Admira in 2009

Personal information
- Date of birth: 28 June 1955 (age 71)
- Place of birth: Pöls, Austria
- Height: 1.80 m (5 ft 11 in)
- Position: Defender

Youth career
- –1974: FC Pöls

Senior career*
Years	Team	Apps	(Gls)
1974–1978	Sturm Graz	116	(9)
1978–1989	Rapid Wien	315	(39)
1989–1994	SV Salzburg	149	(9)
Total		581	(57)

International career
1976–1989	Austria	68	(1)

Managerial career
- 1994–1995: FC Puch
- 1995: Austria U20
- 1995–1996: Austria U18
- 1995–1996: Austria U19
- 1996–1998: SV Salzburg
- 1998–2000: Rapid Wien
- 2001–2002: 1. FC Saarbrücken
- 2003–2004: SC Untersiebenbrunn
- 2008–2010: FC Admira Wacker Mödling (sporting director)
- * Club domestic league appearances and goals

Heribert Weber (born 28 June 1955) is an Austrian former professional football player and manager. He currently works as Sky Austria's main pundit and analyst for their coverage of the Austrian Football Bundesliga, the UEFA Champions League and the UEFA Europa League.

== Club career ==
Born in Styria, Weber started his professional career at Sturm Graz and joined Vienna giants Rapid Wien after the World Cup in 1978. He played a major part in the most successful of Rapid teams in the 1980s, claiming the League crown four times, winning 4 domestic cups and most prominently losing the UEFA Cup Winners Cup Final in 1985 against Everton. He skippered Rapid in 1981 and from 1986 through 1989. He was voted in Rapid's Team of the Century in 1999.

At the end of his career he moved to SV Salzburg, with whom he won another league title during the club's most successful period. In 1994, he played with them in the UEFA Cup final against Inter Milan.

== International career ==
Weber made his debut for Austria in an April 1976 friendly match against Sweden and was a participant at the 1978 FIFA World Cup and at the 1982 FIFA World Cup. He earned 68 caps, scoring one goal. His final international game was an October 1989 World Cup qualification match against Turkey.

== Coaching career ==
As a football coach, Weber coached SV Salzburg with whom he won another league title, Rapid Wien and 1. FC Saarbrücken (Germany).

== Honours ==
=== As a player ===
- Austrian Football Bundesliga:
  - 1982, 1983, 1987, 1988, 1994
- Austrian Cup:
  - 1983, 1984, 1985, 1987

=== As a manager ===
- Austrian Football Bundesliga:
  - 1997
