= Gerhard Hanappi Stadium =

Football stadium in Vienna, Austria

Coordinates: 48°11′52″N 16°15′55″E

Gerhard-Hanappi-Stadion
- Sankt Hanappi
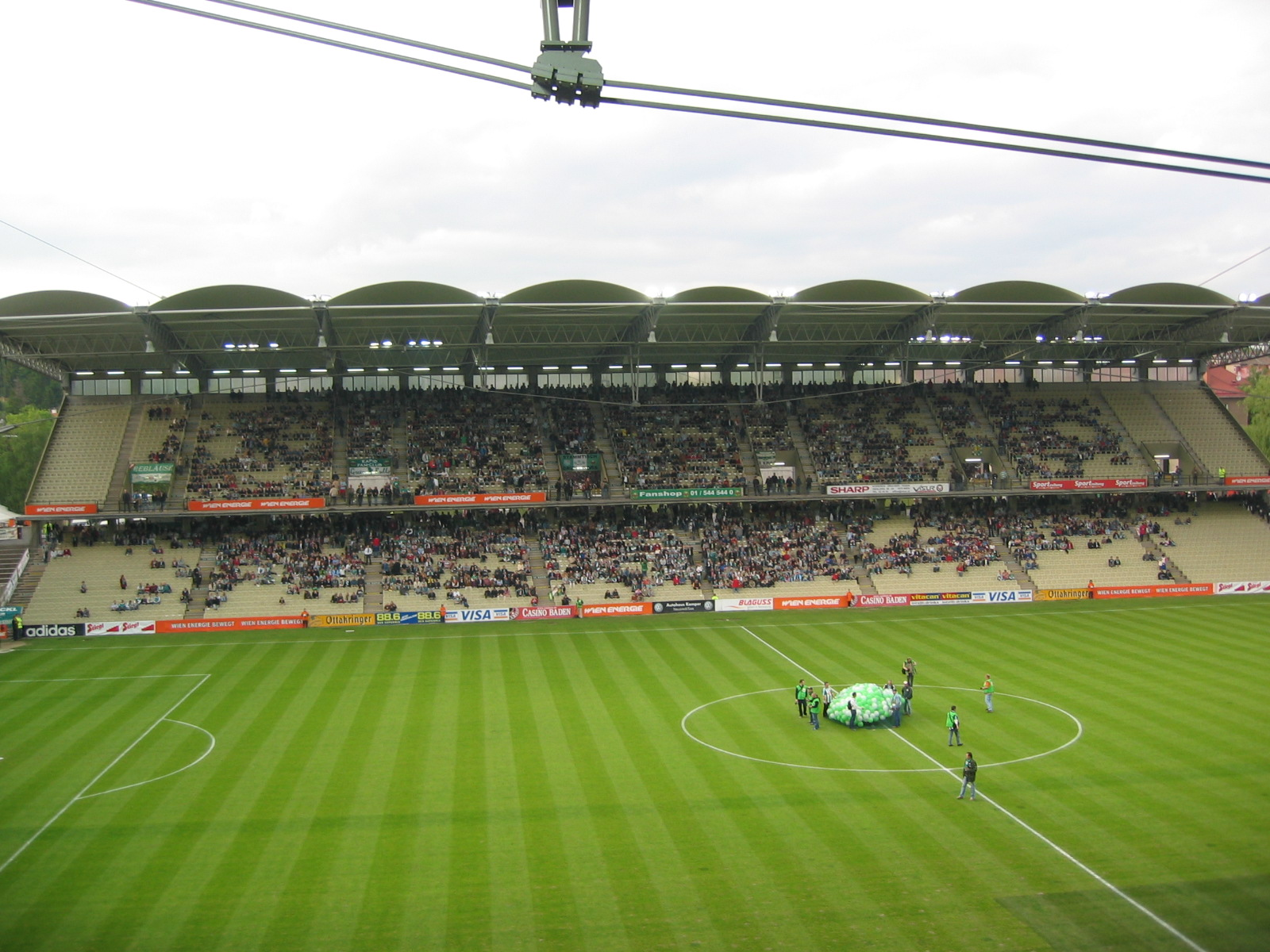
- Interactive map of Gerhard-Hanappi-Stadion
- Former names: Weststadion (1977–1980)
- Location: Hütteldorf
- Capacity: 18,500

Construction
- Opened: 1977
- Closed: 2014
- Demolished: 2014
- Architect: Gerhard Hanappi

Tenant
- Rapid Vienna (1977–2013)

The Gerhard-Hanappi-Stadion was a football stadium in Hütteldorf, in the west of Vienna, Austria. It was the home ground of Rapid Vienna. It was officially opened in 1977 as "Weststadion" (Western stadium). In 1980 it was renamed to honour its architect, Austrian football player Gerhard Hanappi (1929–1980). Among fans the stadium was also known as "Sankt Hanappi" (Saint Hanappi), in reference to the fans' slogan Rapid ist uns're Religion (lit. 'Rapid is our religion').

The stadium was demolished in 2014 to make way for the new Allianz Stadion, which was opened on 16 July 2016. During its construction, Rapid Vienna played their home games at the Ernst-Happel-Stadion in the Prater.

== Photogallery ==
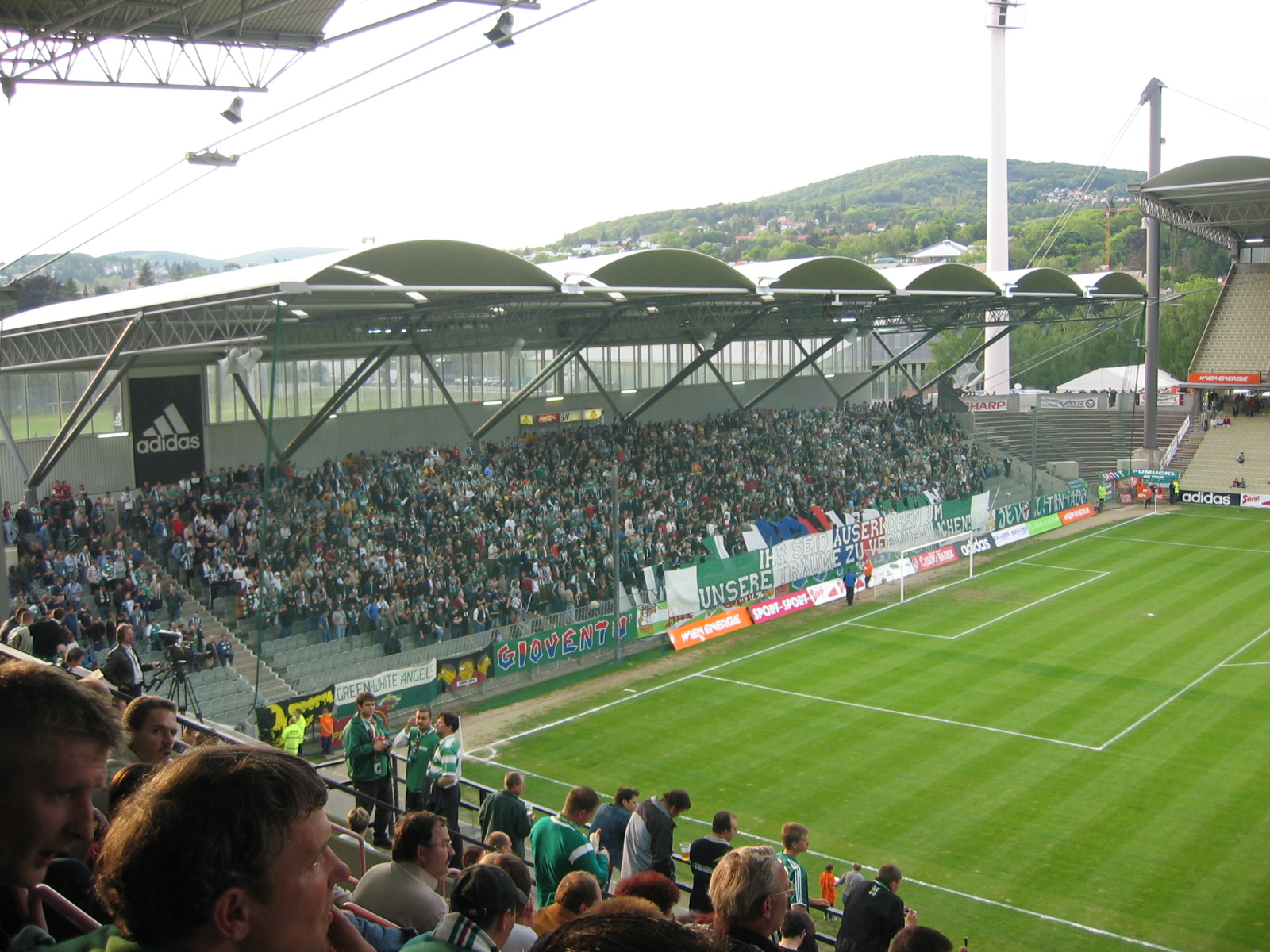
West Stand

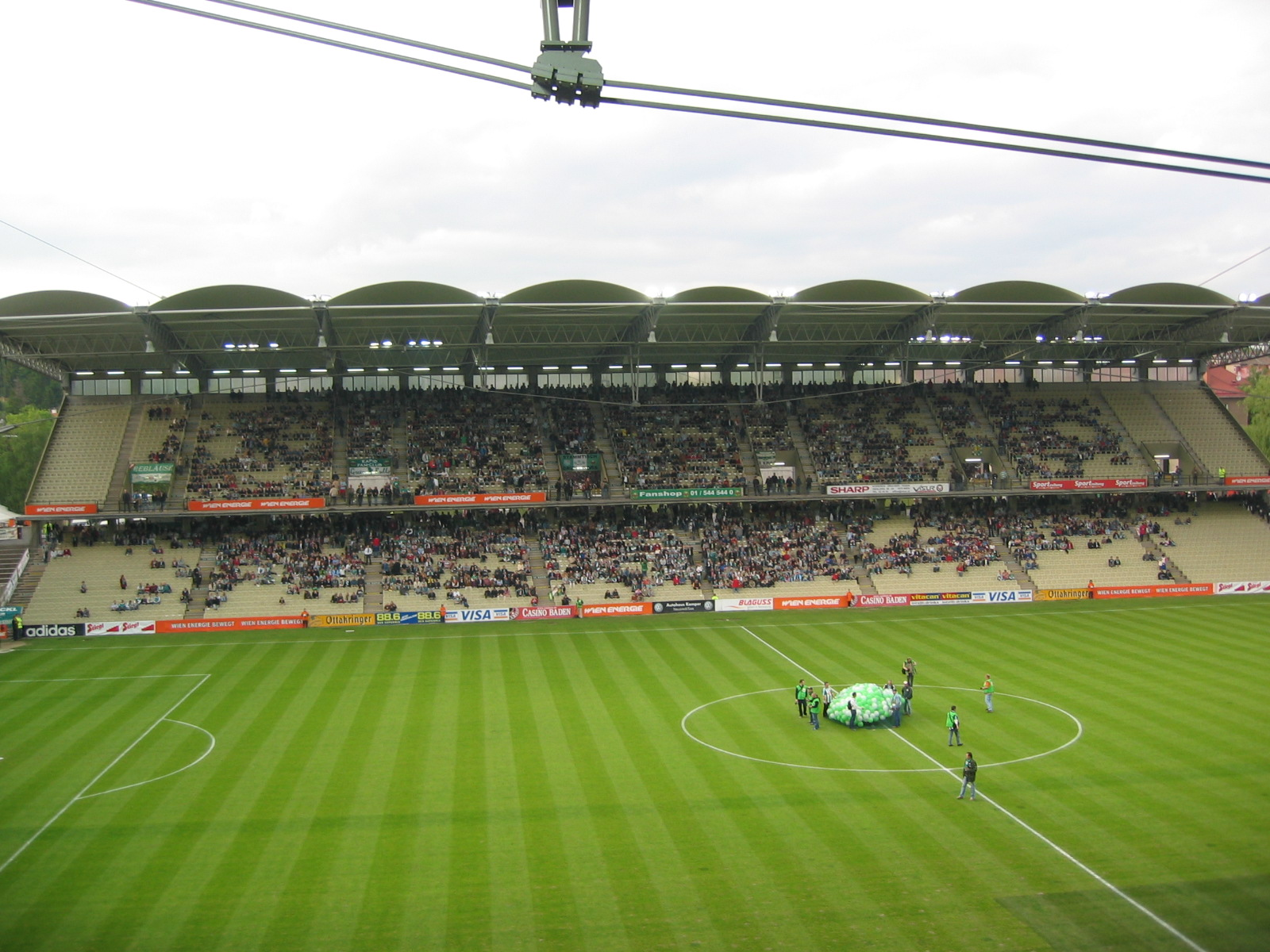
North Stand

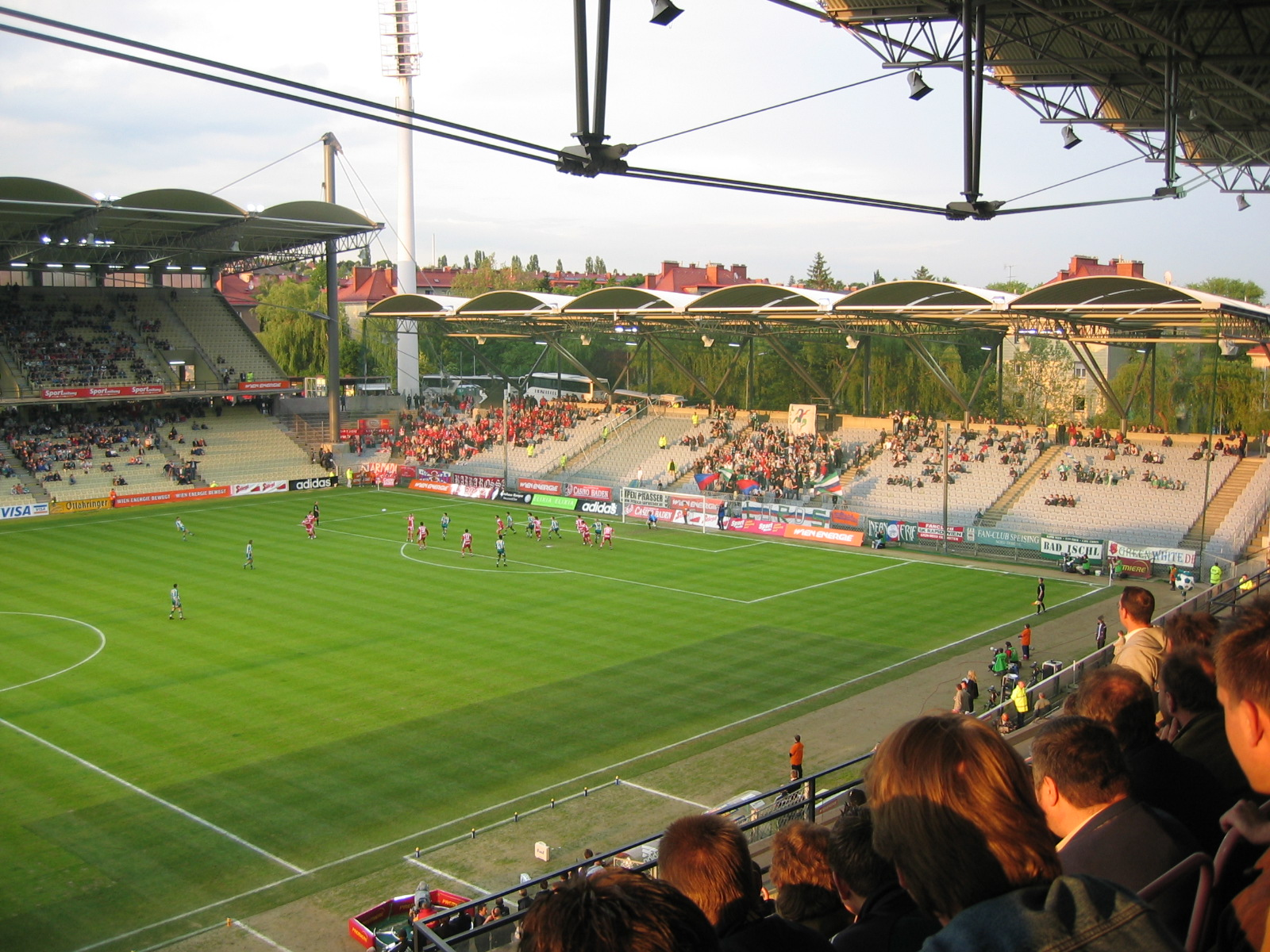
East Stand

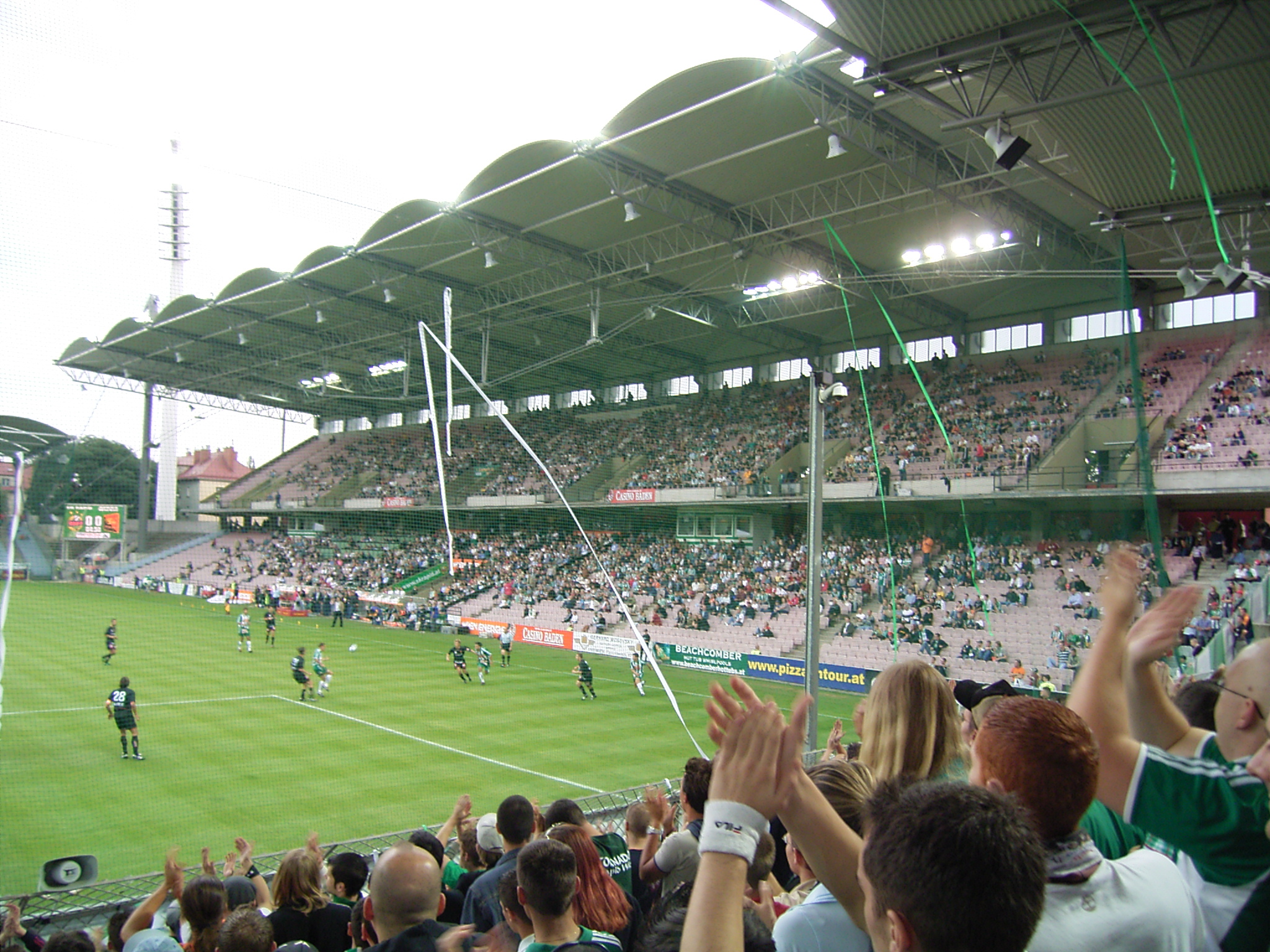
South Stand
