= Reinhard Kienast =

Austrian footballer

Personal information
- Full name: Reinhard Kienast
- Date of birth: 2 September 1959 (age 67)
- Place of birth: Vienna, Austria
- Positions: Defender; midfielder

Senior career*
Years	Team	Apps	(Gls)
1978–1992	Rapid Wien	393	(61)
1992–1993	Favoritner AC		

International career
1983–1987	Austria	13	(3)
- * Club domestic league appearances and goals

Reinhard Kienast (born 2 September 1959) is a retired Austrian football player who played 14 seasons for Rapid Wien and 13 times for the Austria national football team.

Hailing from a football family, he is the younger brother of former Rapid Wien player Wolfgang Kienast and uncle of current Austria international Roman Kienast.

== Club career ==
A versatile player, Kienast played predominantly in midfield for Rapid, but was also employed in defence or in attack. After his 14 seasons at Rapid, he moved to city rivals Favoritner AC. He finished his career with minor sides Süßenbrunn and SG FavAC Simmering. In 1993/1994 he became assistant-coach at Rapid.

He played a major part in the most successful of Rapid teams in the 1980s, claiming the League crown four times and most prominently losing the UEFA Cup Winners Cup Final in 1985 against Everton. He skippered Rapid from 1989 through 1992 and was voted Austria Fan's Footballer of the Year in 1986.

== International career ==
Kienast earned 13 caps for the Nationalmannschaft between 1983 and 1987, scoring 3 goals. In 1986, he scored two of those in a sensational 4–1 defeat of West Germany.

== Honours ==
- Austrian Football Bundesliga (4):
  - 1982, 1983, 1987, 1988
- Austrian Cup (4):
  - 1983, 1984, 1985, 1987
