= 1995–96 SK Rapid Wien season =

Rapid Wien
1995–96 season
- Chairman: Günter Kaltenbrunner
- Manager: Ernst Dokupil
- Stadium: Gerhard Hanappi Stadium
- Bundesliga: 1st
- ÖFB-Cup: 3rd round
- UEFA Cup Winners' Cup: Runners-up
- Austrian Supercup: Runners-up
- Top goalscorer: League: Christian Stumpf (15 goals); All: Christian Stumpf (20 goals)
- Highest home attendance: 48,000
- Lowest home attendance: 5,000
- Average home league attendance: 12,306
- Biggest win: 6–0 v. Admira Wacker (H); 14 May 1996
- Biggest defeat: 1-4 v. Austria Wien (A); 14 October 1995
Home colours	Away colours

The 1995–96 SK Rapid Wien season was the 98th season in the club's history and the club's 22nd consecutive season in the Austrian Football Bundesliga. Rapid began the season by losing the Austrian Supercup to Austria Salzburg, but eventually won the league with 73 points, six points more than the runners-up Sturm Graz, whom they beat and lost twice during the domestic campaign. They were knocked out of the Austrian Cup by Admira Wacker in the third round.

Rapid had its best European campaign since the 1984-85 season in the UEFA Cup Winners' Cup, where the Vienna club defeated Petrolul Ploiesti, Sporting CP, Dynamo Moscow and Feyenoord, but lost the final against Paris Saint-Germain.

== Squad statistics ==
No.	Nat.	Name	Age	League		Cup		Supercup		CW Cup		Total		Discipline	
No.	Nat.	Name	Age	Apps	Goals	Apps	Goals	Apps	Goals	Apps	Goals	Apps	Goals	Booked	Sent off (straight red)
Goalkeepers
1	(Austria)	Michael Konsel	33	36		2		1		9		48		1	
Defenders
4	(Bulgaria)	Trifon Ivanov	29	30	7			1		9	1	40	8	10	
5	(Austria)	Peter Schöttel	28	33+2		2		1		8		44+2		9	
13	(Austria)	Rene Haller	21	1+5		1		0+1		0+4		2+10		2	
19	(Austria)	Michael Hatz	24	30	1	2	1			8		40	2	15	1
Midfielders
2	(Austria)	Patrick Jovanovic	21	26+8		2		1		4+2		33+10		3	1
3	(Austria)	Peter Guggi	27	21+8	3	0+1	1	1		8+1		30+10	4	6	
6	(Austria)	Peter Stöger	29	34+1	7	1+1	1	1		9	1	45+2	9	4	
8	(Austria)	Zoran Barisic	25	18+13	8	1				2+4	2	21+17	10	7	1
10	(Austria)	Dietmar Kühbauer	24	24+2	6	2				5	1	31+2	7	7	
12	(Austria)	Oliver Lederer	17	1+1		2		0+1				3+2			
14	(Slovakia)	Roman Pivarník	28	19+7	2			1		5		25+7	2	3	
15	(Austria)	Sascha Bürringer	19	0+2		1		0+1				1+3			
17	(Austria)	Stephan Marasek	25	32+1	2	1		1	1	8		42+1	3	9	
18	(Tajikistan)	Sergei Mandreko	23	10+8		1		0+1		0+2		11+11		4	
20	(Austria)	Andreas Heraf	27	25+7	5	1+1		1		9		36+8	5	10	
Forwards
7	(Austria)	Christian Stumpf	28	30+3	15	0+2	1			9	4	39+5	20	3	1
9	(Germany)	Carsten Jancker	20	18+9	7	2	3			6+1	6	26+10	16	5	
11	(Poland)	Maciej Sliwowski	28	8+8	5	1+1		1				10+9	5		
	(Norway)	Geir Frigård	24					1				1			

== Fixtures and results ==
Win Draw Loss

=== Bundesliga ===
Rd	Date	Venue	Opponent	Res.	Att.	Goals and discipline
1	02.08.1995	A	Ried	1-2	9,500	Stöger 88'
2	05.08.1995	H	Austria Wien	1-0	10,000	Stumpf 69'
3	12.08.1995	A	GAK	2-1	7,000	Marasek 45', Barisic 49'
4	19.08.1995	H	FC Tirol	3-1	11,000	Stumpf 3' 19', Heraf 41'
5	26.08.1995	A	Steyr	2-0	4,500	Stumpf 63', Marasek 77'
6	30.08.1995	H	Admira	1-1	9,000	Stöger 45'
7	17.09.1995	H	LASK	1-1	8,500	Kühbauer 43'
8	20.09.1995	A	Sturm Graz	1-0	11,000	Kühbauer 86' (pen.); Barisic (red card) 30'
9	23.09.1995	H	Austria Salzburg	3-1	17,500	Stöger 85' 90', Ivanov 88'
10	03.10.1995	A	Austria Salzburg	3-0	14,000	Stumpf 7' 15', Barisic 75'
11	06.10.1995	H	Ried	4-1	7,000	Stumpf 19', Pivarnik 60', Hatz 65', Barisic 73'
12	14.10.1995	A	Austria Wien	1-4	23,000	Barisic 88'
13	22.10.1995	H	GAK	3-1	9,000	Stumpf 5' 83', Jancker 70'
14	28.10.1995	A	FC Tirol	2-1	9,500	Jancker 44', Kühbauer 80' (pen.)
15	05.11.1995	H	Steyr	4-3	5,000	Kühbauer 30' (pen.) 51', Guggi 44', Ivanov 90'
16	08.11.1995	A	Admira	1-1	3,000	Ivanov 11'
17	21.11.1995	A	LASK	0-2	5,000	
18	19.11.1995	H	Sturm Graz	0-2	9,000	
19	02.03.1996	A	LASK	2-0	6,000	Stumpf 39', Jancker 66'
20	10.03.1996	H	Austria Salzburg	3-1	17,000	Stumpf 21' 32' 73'
21	28.02.1996	H	GAK	1-0	5,500	Jancker 47'
22	17.03.1996	A	Admira	0-0	8,200	Stumpf (red card) 90'
23	24.03.1996	H	Steyr	2-0	8,000	Jancker 10', Sliwowski 78'
24	30.03.1996	A	Ried	1-1	7,000	Heraf 70'
25	07.04.1996	H	Austria Wien	0-1	18,000	
26	10.04.1996	A	Sturm Graz	0-1	10,000	Hatz (yellow card) 88' (red card)
27	13.04.1996	H	FC Tirol	3-1	12,000	Stumpf 11', Heraf 36', Jancker 40'
28	30.04.1996	A	FC Tirol	1-1	17,000	Barisic 90'
29	21.04.1996	H	LASK	2-1	10,500	Guggi 12' 75'
30	27.04.1996	A	Austria Salzburg	2-4	14,000	Jancker 16', Heraf 23'
31	21.05.1996	A	GAK	1-1	10,000	Ivanov 9'
32	14.05.1996	H	Admira	6-0	6,000	Stöger 11' 14' 35', Barisic 24', Ivanov 33', Sliwowski 60'
33	11.05.1996	A	Steyr	3-2	4,000	Sliwowski 50' 85', Ivanov 73'
34	18.05.1996	H	Ried	4-2	10,500	Ivanov 43', Sliwowski 48', Barisic 62', Heraf 67'
35	25.05.1996	A	Austria Wien	2-0	23,000	Barisic 62', Kühbauer 90'
36	01.06.1996	H	Sturm Graz	2-0	48,000	Pivarnik 7', Stumpf 87'

==== League table ====
Pos	Team	Pld	W	D	L	GF	GA	GD	Pts	Qualification or relegation
1	Rapid Wien (C)	36	22	7	7	68	38	+30	73	Qualification to Champions League qualifying round
2	Sturm Graz	36	20	7	9	61	35	+26	67	Qualification to Cup Winners' Cup first round
3	Tirol Innsbruck	36	18	8	10	64	40	+24	62	Qualification to UEFA Cup qualifying round
4	Grazer AK	36	14	15	7	46	36	+10	57	Qualification to UEFA Cup qualifying round
5	Austria Wien	36	14	9	13	42	35	+7	51	Qualification to Intertoto Cup group stage

Source: weltfussball.de (in German)
(C) Champions

=== Cup ===
Rd	Date	Venue	Opponent	Res.	Att.	Goals and discipline
R2	09.09.1995	A	Baumgarten	6-1	10,000	Jancker 12' 42', Hatz 32', Stöger 35', Guggi 70', Stumpf 86'
R3	30.09.1995	A	Admira	1-4	3,000	Jancker 3'

=== Austrian Supercup ===
Rd	Date	Venue	Opponent	Res.	Att.	Goals and discipline
F	26.07.1995	A	Austria Salzburg	1-2	6,500	Marasek 81' (pen.)

=== Cup Winners' Cup ===
Rd	Date	Venue	Opponent	Res.	Att.	Goals and discipline
R1-L1	14.09.1995	H	Petrolul Ploiesti (Romania)	3-1	12,000	Barisic 45' 90' (pen.), Ivanov 59'
R1-L2	28.09.1995	A	Petrolul Ploiesti (Romania)	0-0	11,000	
R2-L1	19.10.1995	A	Sporting CP (Portugal)	0-2	40,000	
R2-L2	02.11.1995	H	Sporting CP (Portugal)	4-0 (a.e.t.)	25,000	Kühbauer 25', Stumpf 90' 105', Jancker 110'
QF-L1	07.03.1996	A	Dynamo Moscow (Russia)	1-0	3,500	Stumpf 34'
QF-L2	21.03.1996	H	Dynamo Moscow (Russia)	3-0	44,000	Jancker 48' 74', Stöger 62' (pen.); Jovanovic P. (red card) 83'
SF-L1	04.04.1996	A	Feyenoord (Netherlands)	1-1	48,000	Jancker 67'
SF-L2	18.04.1996	H	Feyenoord (Netherlands)	3-0	48,000	Jancker 2' 35', Stumpf 32'
F	08.05.1996	N	PSG (France)	0-1	36,000	
