= 1994–95 SK Rapid Wien season =

Rapid Wien
1994–95 season
- President: Karlheinz Oertel
- Coach: Ernst Dokupil
- Stadium: Gerhard Hanappi Stadium, Vienna, Austria
- Bundesliga: 3rd
- ÖFB-Cup: Winner (14th title)
- Top goalscorer: League: Marcus Pürk (13); All: Marcus Pürk (17)
- Highest home attendance: 19,600
- Lowest home attendance: 3,200

The 1994–95 SK Rapid Wien season is the 97th season in club history.

== Squad statistics ==
No.	Nat.	Name	Age	League		Cup		Total		Discipline	
No.	Nat.	Name	Age	Apps	Goals	Apps	Goals	Apps	Goals	Booked	Sent off (straight red)
Goalkeepers
1	(Austria)	Michael Konsel	32	36		6		42		1	
Defenders
3	(Austria)	Kurt Garger	33	3+5	1	2		5+5	1		
4	(Austria)	Robert Pecl	28	15+1		0+1		15+2		5	
5	(Austria)	Peter Schöttel	27	30		6		36		9	1
8	(Austria)	Zoran Barisic	24	20+2	3	4		24+2	3	4	1
19	(Austria)	Michael Hatz	23	33	5	5		38	5	8	
Midfielders
2	(Austria)	Patrick Jovanovic	20	20+8	1	2		22+8	1		1
3	(Austria)	Peter Guggi	26	15+1	2	4	2	19+1	4	2	
6	(Slovenia)	Alfred Jermanis	27	16+2	1	1		17+2	1	4	1
10	(Austria)	Dietmar Kühbauer	23	27	7	4	1	31	8	10	2
11	(Poland)	Maciej Sliwowski	27	30+1	8	4	2	34+1	10	2	
12	(Austria)	Amir Bradaric	19	0+3		0+1		0+4			
13	(Austria)	Rene Haller	20	6+8		2+2	1	8+10	1	3	
14	(Slovakia)	Roman Pivarník	27	22+1	3	1		23+1	3	3	
15	(Austria)	Sascha Bürringer	18	2+8		1+4		3+12		2	
17	(Austria)	Stephan Marasek	24	32	2	6	1	38	3	5	1
18	(Tajikistan)	Sergei Mandreko	22	27	7	5	1	32	8	5	
20	(Austria)	Andreas Heraf	26	14+1	6	2		16+1	6	1	
Forwards
7	(Austria)	Marcus Pürk	19	34	13	6	4	40	17	2	1
9	(Hungary)	István Puskás	22	3		2	2	5	2		
16	(Austria)	Gerald Obrecht	20	11+12	4	3+1	2	14+13	6		

== Fixtures and results ==
Win Draw Loss

=== Bundesliga ===
Rd	Date	Venue	Opponent	Res.	Att.	Goals and discipline
1	03.08.1994	H	Admira	2-2	8,500	Heraf 25', Kühbauer 85' (pen.); Marasek (red card) 63'
2	06.08.1994	A	Austria Salzburg	0-3	12,000	Schöttel (red card) 29'
3	13.08.1994	H	VÖEST Linz	0-0	4,500	
4	20.08.1994	A	Austria Wien	1-1	7,600	Sliwowski 2'
5	27.08.1994	H	Steyr	3-1	3,200	Hatz 21', Sliwowski 73', Pürk 79'
6	30.08.1994	A	VfB Mödling	2-1	3,500	Sliwowski 45', Obrecht 86'
7	03.09.1994	H	FC Tirol	3-1	10,000	Obrecht 44', Pürk 53', Garger 56'
8	17.09.1994	A	LASK	3-1	7,000	Pürk 48', Hatz 62', Mandreko 83'
9	21.09.1994	H	Sturm Graz	2-3	15,000	Pürk 47' 84'
10	24.09.1994	A	Sturm Graz	0-2	11,000	
11	01.10.1994	A	Admira	0-3	4,000	
12	05.10.1994	H	Austria Salzburg	1-1	10,500	Barisic 7'
13	14.10.1994	A	VÖEST Linz	1-1	4,000	Mandreko 70'
14	23.10.1994	H	Austria Wien	3-1	14,500	Pürk 34', Jovanovic P. 58', Barisic 87'
15	29.10.1994	A	Steyr	2-1	7,000	Pürk 71', Sliwowski 78'; Jovanovic P. (red card) 22'
16	05.11.1994	H	VfB Mödling	2-1	4,500	Pürk 43', Pivarnik 57'
17	19.11.1994	A	FC Tirol	3-2	13,000	Pürk 5' 9', Mandreko 32'
18	26.11.1994	H	LASK	1-2	10,000	Kühbauer 10'
19	04.03.1995	A	VÖEST Linz	3-2	3,500	Sliwowski 5', Heraf 35', Pürk 51'
20	11.03.1995	H	Austria Salzburg	0-2	19,600	
21	18.03.1995	A	Sturm Graz	0-2	10,000	Pürk (red card) 45'
22	21.03.1995	H	Admira	3-2	3,500	Obrecht 36' 66', Marasek 73'
23	25.03.1995	A	Austria Wien	1-1	22,000	Mandreko 13'
24	01.04.1995	H	Steyr	3-1	3,200	Hatz 3', Heraf 51', Kühbauer 73'
25	08.04.1995	A	FC Tirol	3-2	7,000	Kühbauer 26', Sliwowski 42', Mandreko 82'; Barisic (red card) 56'
26	12.04.1995	H	VfB Mödling	2-1	4,500	Kühbauer 37', Sliwowski 67'
27	22.04.1995	A	LASK	2-1	18,000	Jermanis 21', Mandreko 81'
28	29.04.1995	H	LASK	3-0	12,500	Pürk 13', Kühbauer 33', Guggi 40'
29	06.05.1995	H	VÖEST Linz	4-1	9,000	Mandreko 2', Sliwowski 3', Pivarnik 5', Pürk 21'
30	13.05.1995	A	Austria Salzburg	0-0	14,500	
31	20.05.1995	H	Sturm Graz	1-3	12,500	Barisic 50'
32	09.05.1995	A	Admira	2-0	9,000	Pivarnik 17', Marasek 55'
33	28.05.1995	H	Austria Wien	1-3	18,000	Hatz 46'; Kühbauer (yellow card) 66' (red card)
34	02.06.1995	A	Steyr	1-0	4,000	Heraf 16'
35	14.06.1995	H	FC Tirol	2-2	8,500	Hatz 27', Heraf 74'
36	17.06.1995	A	VfB Mödling	3-0	3,000	Kühbauer 24', Heraf 40', Guggi 73'; Kühbauer (yellow card) 43' (red card)

==== League table ====
Pos	Team	Pld	W	D	L	GF	GA	GD	Pts	Qualification or relegation
1	Austria Salzburg (C)	36	15	17	4	48	24	+24	47	Qualification to Champions League qualifying round
2	Sturm Graz	36	18	11	7	58	41	+17	47	Qualification to UEFA Cup preliminary round
3	Rapid Wien	36	19	8	9	63	50	+13	46	Qualification to Cup Winners' Cup first round
4	Austria Wien	36	16	11	9	58	38	+20	43	Qualification to UEFA Cup preliminary round
5	Tirol Innsbruck	36	15	10	11	61	44	+17	40	Qualification to Intertoto Cup group stage

Source: weltfussball.de (in German)
(C) Champions

=== Cup ===
Rd	Date	Venue	Opponent	Res.	Att.	Goals and discipline
R2	10.09.1994	A	Oed/Zeillern	6-0	2,000	Haller 20', Sliwowski 40', Obrecht 60', Marasek 73', Puskas 79', Pürk 84'
R3	26.10.1994	A	Deutschkreutz	4-0	4,000	Pürk 17', Obrecht 54', Puskas 56', Kühbauer 75' (pen.)
R16	16.04.1995	A	Wörgl	3-2	3,000	Mandreko 16', Guggi 21', Sliwowski 73'
QF	02.05.1995	A	GAK	0-0 (5-4 p)	4,000	Jermanis (red card) 27'
SF	16.05.1995	H	Austria Salzburg	2-0	17,000	Pürk 71' 81'
F	05.06.1995	N	Leoben	1-0	15,000	Guggi 20'
