= 1996–97 SK Rapid Wien season =

Rapid Wien
1996–97 season
- President: Günter Kaltenbrunner
- Coach: Ernst Dokupil
- Stadium: Gerhard Hanappi Stadium, Vienna, Austria
- Bundesliga: 2nd
- ÖFB-Cup: 3rd round
- Champions League: Group stage
- Top goalscorer: League: René Wagner (21); All: René Wagner (21)
- Highest home attendance: 15,500
- Lowest home attendance: 5,000

The 1996–97 SK Rapid Wien season was the 99th season in club history.

== Squad statistics ==
No.	Nat.	Name	Age	League		Cup		Supercup		Champions League		Total		Discipline	
No.	Nat.	Name	Age	Apps	Goals	Apps	Goals	Apps	Goals	Apps	Goals	Apps	Goals	Booked	Sent off (straight red)
Goalkeepers
1	(Austria)	Michael Konsel	34	35		1		1		8		45		1	1
21	(Austria)	Raimund Hedl	21	1								1			
Defenders
2	(Austria)	Patrick Jovanovic	22	20+5		1				0+4		21+9		3	
4	(Bulgaria)	Trifon Ivanov	30	23				1		8	2	32	2	5	2
5	(Austria)	Peter Schöttel	29	32		0+1				7		39+1		9	1
15	(Poland)	Andrzej Lesiak	30	27+4	4	1		1		6	1	35+4	5	6	
19	(Austria)	Thomas Zingler	25	12+2	2	1		1		7		21+2	2	5	1
	(Austria)	Friedrich Breitenfelder	16	0+1								0+1			
Midfielders
3	(Austria)	Peter Guggi	28	15+11		1		1		1+2	1	18+13	1	4	
6	(Austria)	Peter Stöger	30	32+2	9	1		1		6+1		40+3	9	7	
8	(Austria)	Zoran Barisic	26	1+5		1		1		1+1		4+6			
10	(Austria)	Dietmar Kühbauer	25	31	11	1		1		8	1	41	12	9	1
11	(Austria)	Christian Prosenik	28	33+2	2					8		41+2	2	2	
12	(Austria)	Oliver Lederer	18	1+3								1+3			
14	(Slovakia)	Roman Pivarník	29	6+4		1		1		0+2		8+6		1	
16	(Poland)	Krzysztof Ratajczyk	22	24+5	1			1		5+1		30+6	1	3	
20	(Austria)	Andreas Heraf	28	31	4	0+1		0+1		7		38+2	4	12	
Forwards
7	(Austria)	Christian Stumpf	29	16+8	6	1	1	0+1		5+3	2	22+12	9	4	
9	(Slovakia)	Marek Penksa	22	12+15	4	1		1		3+2		17+17	4	2	
17	(Czech Republic)	René Wagner	23	28+1	21	0+1				5		33+2	21	9	2
18	(Tajikistan)	Sergei Mandreko	24	12+7	4					3+2		15+9	4	5	1
24	(Cameroon)	Samuel Ipoua	23	4+3								4+3			1
	(Austria)	Martin Pfeifer	16	0+1								0+1			

== Fixtures and results ==
Win Draw Loss

=== Bundesliga ===
Rd	Date	Venue	Opponent	Res.	Att.	Goals and discipline
1	24.07.1996	A	GAK	1-1	8,500	Penksa 6'
2	18.09.1996	H	LASK	3-1	7,500	Kühbauer 10', Heraf 12', Wagner R. 47'
3	03.08.1996	A	FC Tirol	1-1	1,000	Mandreko 70'
4	11.08.1996	H	Austria Wien	1-1	15,000	Zingler 8'; Zingler (red card) 59'
5	17.08.1996	A	Sturm Graz	0-0	10,000	
6	24.08.1996	H	VÖEST Linz	0-0	6,500	Ivanov (red card) 35'
7	04.09.1996	A	Ried	3-3	6,000	Heraf 37', Wagner R. 48', Penksa 89'
8	07.09.1996	H	Austria Salzburg	2-0	8,000	Kühbauer 15', Wagner R. 84'
9	14.09.1996	H	Admira	4-1	5,500	Lesiak 6' 51', Stöger 34' 68'
10	21.09.1996	A	Admira	2-0	6,000	Wagner R. 29' 67'
11	02.10.1996	H	GAK	4-0	5,000	Stumpf 24' 60', Wagner R. 40', Stöger 85'
12	12.10.1996	A	LASK	0-3	12,000	Schöttel (red card) 47'
13	19.10.1996	H	FC Tirol	4-2	11,000	Lesiak 34', Stumpf 45', Kühbauer 66' (pen.) 82' (pen.)
14	23.10.1996	A	Austria Wien	2-0	18,000	Heraf 50', Prosenik C. 90'; Wagner R. (yellow card) 40' (red card)
15	26.10.1996	H	Sturm Graz	3-1	15,500	Kühbauer 1', Zingler 35', Penksa 88'
16	05.11.1996	A	VÖEST Linz	1-0	3,500	Kühbauer 16'
17	16.11.1996	H	Ried	6-0	7,500	Stöger 1', Wagner R. 3' 83', Lesiak 27', Heraf 31', Kühbauer 85'
18	24.11.1996	A	Austria Salzburg	1-1	12,000	Wagner R. 1'
19	02.03.1997	A	FC Tirol	4-2	10,000	Wagner R. 17', Kühbauer 45' (pen.) 66' (pen.), Prosenik C. 88'
20	09.03.1997	H	Austria Wien	3-0	15,000	Stöger 58', Wagner R. 86' 87'
21	12.03.1997	A	GAK	0-1	5,500	
22	15.03.1997	H	LASK	0-0	8,000	
23	22.03.1997	A	Ried	0-3	7,500	Konsel (red card) 73'
24	25.03.1997	H	Austria Salzburg	2-0	14,500	Wagner R. 73' 88'
25	05.04.1997	H	Sturm Graz	0-2	10,000	
26	12.04.1997	A	Admira	2-1	8,500	Kühbauer 29', Stöger 48'
27	16.04.1997	H	VÖEST Linz	4-2	5,000	Wagner R. 32' 79' 89', Stöger 52'
28	19.04.1997	A	VÖEST Linz	1-1	4,000	Wagner R. 33'
29	26.04.1997	H	FC Tirol	3-0	9,000	Mandreko 30' 83', Wagner R. 54'
30	04.05.1997	A	Austria Wien	0-0	20,000	Ipoua (red card) 87'
31	11.05.1997	H	GAK	2-1	8,000	Stöger 51', Ratajczyk 67'
32	17.05.1997	A	LASK	1-1	7,500	Mandreko 39'
33	20.05.1997	H	Ried	2-2	6,000	Wagner R. 36' 37'; Mandreko (red card) 18', Kühbauer (red card) 18'
34	24.05.1997	A	Austria Salzburg	0-2	15,000	Wagner R. (yellow card) 85' (red card) , Ivanov (red card) 88'
35	31.05.1997	A	Sturm Graz	0-3	10,000	
36	03.06.1997	H	Admira	7-0	6,000	Stumpf 4' 16' 50', Penksa 19', Kühbauer 32', Stöger 34', Wimmer 71' (o.g.)

==== League table ====
Pos	Team	Pld	W	D	L	GF	GA	GD	Pts	Qualification or relegation
1	Austria Salzburg (C)	36	19	12	5	54	25	+29	69	Qualification to Champions League second qualifying round
2	Rapid Wien	36	18	12	6	69	36	+33	66	Qualification to UEFA Cup second qualifying round
3	Sturm Graz	36	14	13	9	50	31	+19	55	Qualification to Cup Winners' Cup first round
4	Tirol Innsbruck	36	16	7	13	49	40	+9	55	Qualification to UEFA Cup second qualifying round
5	Grazer AK	36	11	14	11	39	42	−3	47	Qualification to Intertoto Cup group stage

Source: weltfussball.de (in German)
(C) Champions

=== Cup ===
Rd	Date	Venue	Opponent	Res.	Att.	Goals and discipline
R3	28.09.1996	A	Kottingbrunn	1-2	4,300	Stumpf 18'

=== Austrian Supercup ===
Rd	Date	Venue	Opponent	Res.	Att.	Goals and discipline
F	27.07.1996	A	Sturm Graz	0-1	7,000	

=== Champions League ===
==== Qualification round ====
Rd	Date	Venue	Opponent	Res.	Att.	Goals and discipline
QR	07.08.1996	H	Dynamo Kyiv (Ukraine)	2-0	29,500	Stumpf 8', Guggi 90'
QR-L1	21.08.1996	A	Dynamo Kyiv (Ukraine)	4-2	70,000	Ivanov 20' 40', Kühbauer 29', Golowko 62' (o.g.)

==== Group stage ====
Rd	Date	Venue	Opponent	Res.	Att.	Goals and discipline
G1	11.09.1996	H	Fenerbahçe (Turkey)	1-1	41,500	Stumpf 70'
G2	25.09.1996	A	Manchester United (England)	0-2	50,000	
G3	16.10.1996	H	Juventus (Italy)	1-1	46,500	Lesiak 20'
G4	30.10.1996	A	Juventus (Italy)	0-5	27,000	
G5	28.11.1996	A	Fenerbahçe (Turkey)	0-1	30,000	
G6	04.12.1996	H	Manchester United (England)	0-2	45,000	
