= 1993–94 SK Rapid Wien season =

Rapid Wien
1993–94 season
- President: Helmut Böhmert
- Coach: Hubert Baumgartner; Ernst Dokupil
- Stadium: Gerhard Hanappi Stadium, Vienna, Austria
- Bundesliga: 5th
- ÖFB-Cup: 4th round
- Top goalscorer: League: Andrzej Kubica (9); All: Andrzej Kubica (11)
- Highest home attendance: 18,500
- Lowest home attendance: 1,500

The 1993–94 SK Rapid Wien season is the 96th season in club history.

== Squad statistics ==
No.	Nat.	Name	Age	League		Cup		Total		Discipline	
No.	Nat.	Name	Age	Apps	Goals	Apps	Goals	Apps	Goals	Booked	Sent off (straight red)
Goalkeepers
1	(Austria)	Michael Konsel	31	34		3		37		2	1
1	(Austria)	Roland Schrammel	24	2+1				2+1			
Defenders
2	(Austria)	Rene Haller	19	3+4				3+4		1	
3	(Austria)	Michael Zisser	26	20		1		21		7	1
4	(Austria)	Robert Pecl	27	15	3	2		17	3	6	
5	(Austria)	Peter Schöttel	26	30		2		32		7	1
13	(Austria)	Patrick Jovanovic	19	3+4		0+1		3+5			
14	(Austria)	Karl Brauneder	33	20+9		2		22+9		2	1
15	(Austria)	Michael Hatz	22	21+1		1		22+1		8	
	(Bosnia and Herzegovina)	Haris Alihodzic	25	7	1			7	1	3	
Midfielders
6	(Austria)	Franz Blizenec	26	26+4		3		29+4		6	
7	(Austria)	Franz Weber	28	19+2		1+1		20+3		4	
8	(Austria)	Zoran Barisic	23	14+10		1	2	15+10	2	4	
10	(Austria)	Dietmar Kühbauer	22	30+1	6	3	3	33+1	9	15	
15	(Austria)	Sascha Bürringer	17	0+2				0+2			
17	(Austria)	Stephan Marasek	23	32+2	1	3	1	35+2	2	5	
18	(Tajikistan)	Sergei Mandreko	21	21	2	2		23	2	1	
19	(Austria)	Alfred Hörtnagl	26	21+3	2	3	2	24+3	4	9	1
20	(Austria)	Horst Steiger	23	16+3	4	1+1		17+4	4	2	
	(Austria)	Roman Stary	19	0+1				0+1			
Forwards
9	(Poland)	Andrzej Kubica	20	32	9	3	2	35	11	4	1
11	(Poland)	Maciej Sliwowski	26	19+5	8	1		20+5	8	2	1
12	(Nigeria)	Frank Daniels	25	8	2			8	2	1	
16	(Austria)	Gerald Obrecht	19	2+3		1+1	1	3+4	1	1	
	(Austria)	Martin Krejci	17	1				1			

== Fixtures and results ==
Win Draw Loss

=== Bundesliga ===
Rd	Date	Venue	Opponent	Res.	Att.	Goals and discipline
1	31.07.1993	A	Sturm Graz	0-1	9,000	
2	04.08.1993	H	Wiener SC	3-1	5,200	Kubica 8', Kühbauer 69' (pen.), Mandreko 81'
3	07.08.1993	A	FC Tirol	1-1	7,000	Mandreko 6'
4	11.08.1993	H	Austria Wien	0-3	18,500	
5	14.08.1993	A	VfB Mödling	1-1	6,500	Pecl 80'
6	20.08.1993	H	VSE St. Pölten	4-0	4,500	Kubica 24' 49', Sliwowski 25' 47'
7	28.08.1993	A	Austria Salzburg	0-1	10,000	
8	01.09.1993	H	Steyr	1-1	3,300	Sliwowski 80'
9	04.09.1993	H	Admira	1-2	3,300	Hörtnagl 90+1'
10	08.09.1993	A	Admira	0-2	4,000	
11	17.09.1993	H	Sturm Graz	2-1	3,000	Sliwowski 72', Pecl 90+1'
12	25.09.1993	A	Wiener SC	1-0	3,500	Pecl 48'
13	02.10.1993	H	FC Tirol	2-0	5,300	Sliwowski 10', Steiger 18'
14	09.10.1993	A	Austria Wien	1-2	12,500	Steiger 65'; Zisser (red card) 85'
15	23.10.1993	H	VfB Mödling	0-0	3,500	
16	30.10.1993	A	VSE St. Pölten	1-1	5,000	Kühbauer 66' (pen.); Kubica (red card) 83'
17	06.11.1993	H	Austria Salzburg	0-3	5,000	Hörtnagl (red card) 65'
18	13.11.1993	A	Steyr	0-3	4,000	
19	20.11.1993	A	Sturm Graz	2-1	2,500	Steiger 19', Kubica 48'
20	27.11.1993	H	Wiener SC	0-0	1,500	
21	05.03.1994	A	FC Tirol	1-0	6,500	Daniels 72'
22	12.03.1994	H	Austria Wien	1-1	17,000	Kubica 66'
23	19.03.1994	A	VfB Mödling	0-0	5,000	Schöttel (red card) 80'
24	25.03.1994	H	VSE St. Pölten	5-3	3,500	Kubica 7', Kühbauer 29' 79', Sliwowski 52' 55'
25	05.04.1994	A	Austria Salzburg	1-2	10,000	Alihodzic 90'
26	09.04.1994	H	Steyr	3-0	3,500	Kubica 6', Hörtnagl 71', Daniels 76'
27	16.04.1994	H	Admira	0-3	4,800	
28	23.04.1994	A	Admira	0-0	3,500	
29	30.04.1994	H	Sturm Graz	2-4	2,500	Kubica 63', Kühbauer 81'; Brauneder (red card) 50', Konsel (red card) 78'
30	03.05.1994	A	Wiener SC	1-0	2,500	Kubica 81'
31	07.05.1994	H	FC Tirol	2-0	2,300	Steiger 25', Kühbauer 62'
32	13.05.1994	A	Austria Wien	0-2	8,000	
33	21.05.1994	H	VfB Mödling	0-2	2,500	
34	28.05.1994	A	VSE St. Pölten	1-1	2,200	Marasek 39'; Sliwowski (red card) 12'
35	05.06.1994	H	Austria Salzburg	0-0	11,000	
36	08.06.1994	A	Steyr	1-0	2,000	Sliwowski 27'

==== League table ====
Pos	Team	Pld	W	D	L	GF	GA	GD	Pts	Qualification or relegation
3	Admira/Wacker	36	18	8	10	51	35	+16	44	Qualification to UEFA Cup first round
4	Tirol Innsbruck	36	14	11	11	48	33	+15	39	Qualification to UEFA Cup first round
5	Rapid Wien	36	12	11	13	38	42	−4	35	
6	VfB Mödling	36	12	11	13	32	49	−17	35	
7	Sturm Graz	36	12	9	15	37	42	−5	33	

Source: weltfussball.de (in German)

=== Cup ===
Rd	Date	Venue	Opponent	Res.	Att.	Goals and discipline
R2	10.09.1993	A	Slovan Wien	5-1	1,000	Barisic 54' 80', Kühbauer 55' (pen.) 87' (pen.), Kubica 62'
R3	16.10.1993	A	Schwechat	6-0	3,000	Kühbauer 13' (pen.), Obrecht 15', Hörtnagl 45' 72', Kubica 77' (pen.), Marasek 90' (pen.)
R16	02.04.1994	A	Admira	0-1	3,500	
