= 1996 UEFA Cup Winners' Cup final =

- Match programme cover
- Event: 1995–96 UEFA Cup Winners' Cup
Paris Saint-Germain	Rapid Wien
(France)	(Austria)
1	0
- Date: 8 May 1996
- Venue: King Baudouin Stadium, Brussels
- Referee: Pierluigi Pairetto (Italy)
- Attendance: 38,402

The 1996 UEFA Cup Winners' Cup final was a football match contested between Paris Saint-Germain of France and Rapid Wien of Austria. It was the final match of the 1995–96 UEFA Cup Winners' Cup and the 36th Cup Winners' Cup final. The final was held at King Baudouin Stadium in Brussels on 8 May 1996, hosting its first European club final since the scenes of the Heysel Stadium disaster eleven years prior. Paris Saint-Germain won the match 1–0, thanks to a free kick from Bruno Ngotty.

== Route to the final ==
(France) Paris Saint-Germain				Round	(Austria) Rapid Wien			
Opponent	Agg.	1st leg	2nd leg	Stages	Opponent	Agg.	1st leg	2nd leg
(Norway) Molde	6–2	3–2 (A)	3–0 (H)	First round	(Romania) Petrolul Ploiești	3–1	3–1 (H)	0–0 (A)
(Scotland) Celtic	4–0	1–0 (H)	3–0 (A)	Second round	(Portugal) Sporting CP	4–2	0–2 (A)	4–0 (aet) (H)
(Italy) Parma	3–2	0–1 (A)	3–1 (H)	Quarter-finals	(Russia) Dynamo Moscow	4–0	1–0 (A)	3–0 (H)
(Spain) Deportivo La Coruña	2–0	1–0 (A)	1–0 (H)	Semi-finals	(Netherlands) Feyenoord	4–1	1–1 (A)	3–0 (H)

== Match ==
=== Details ===
8 May 1996
20:15 CEST

Paris Saint-Germain (France)	1–0	(Austria) Rapid Wien
Ngotty 29'	Report

King Baudouin Stadium, Brussels
Attendance: 38,402
Referee: Pierluigi Pairetto (Italy)

Paris Saint-Germain	Rapid Wien

GK	1	(France) Bernard Lama (c)
ML	3	(France) Patrick Colleter
CB	4	(France) Bruno Ngotty
CB	2	(France) Paul Le Guen
CB	5	(France) Alain Roche
RM	9	(France) Laurent Fournier	(yellow card) 56'	(substituted off) 77'
DM	7	(France) Daniel Bravo
DM	8	(France) Vincent Guérin
AM	10	(Brazil) Raí		(substituted off) 12'
CF	6	(France) Youri Djorkaeff
CF	11	(France) Patrice Loko
Substitutes:
FW	12	(France) Pascal Nouma
DF	13	(Senegal) Oumar Dieng
DF	14	(France) Francis Llacer		(substituted on) 77'
FW	15	(Panama) Julio Dely Valdés		(substituted on) 12'
GK	16	(France) Richard Dutruel
Manager:
(France) Luis Fernández

GK	1	(Austria) Michael Konsel (c)
CB	2	(Austria) Michael Hatz	(yellow card) 54'
CB	4	(Bulgaria) Trifon Ivanov
CB	5	(Austria) Peter Schöttel	(yellow card) 37'
RM	3	(Austria) Peter Guggi
DM	11	(Austria) Andreas Heraf	(yellow card) 67'
DM	10	(Austria) Dietmar Kühbauer
AM	6	(Austria) Peter Stöger	(yellow card) 84'
LM	8	(Austria) Stephan Marasek
CF	7	(Austria) Christian Stumpf		(substituted off) 46'
CF	9	(Germany) Carsten Jancker	(yellow card) 34'
Substitutes:
MF	12	(Austria) Oliver Lederer
DF	13	(Austria) René Haller
MF	14	(Austria) Zoran Barisic		(substituted on) 46'
MF	15	(Russia) Sergei Mandreko
GK	16	(Austria) Raimund Hedl
Manager:
(Austria) Ernst Dokupil

Assistant referees:
Donato Nicoletti (Italy)
Tullio Manfredini (Italy)
Fourth official:
Marcello Nicchi (Italy)

Match rules

- 90 minutes.
- 30 minutes of golden goal extra time if necessary.
- Penalty shoot-out if scores still level.
- Five named substitutes.
- Maximum of three substitutions.

== See also ==
- 1996 UEFA Champions League final
- 1996 UEFA Cup final
- Paris Saint-Germain F.C. in international football
