= Dietmar Kühbauer =

Austrian football manager (born 1971)

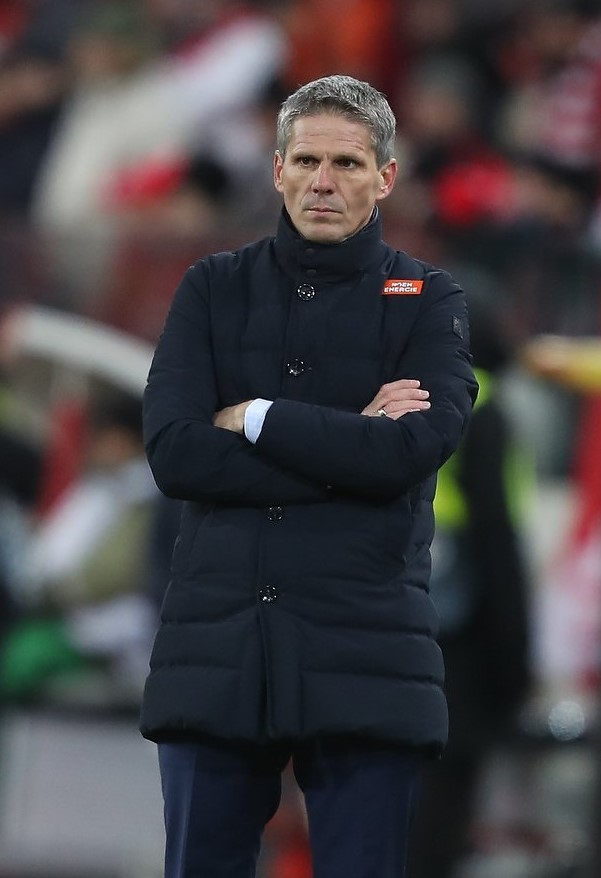
- Kühbauer with Rapid Wien in 2018

Personal information
- Date of birth: 4 April 1971 (age 55)
- Place of birth: Heiligenkreuz im Lafnitztal, Austria
- Height: 1.73 m (5 ft 8 in)
- Position: Midfielder

Team information
- Current team: LASK (head coach)

Youth career
- SV Mattersburg

Senior career*
| Years | Team | Apps | (Gls) |
| 1987–1992 | Admira/Wacker | 121 | (7) |
| 1992–1997 | Rapid Wien | 148 | (33) |
| 1997–2000 | Real Sociedad | 48 | (2) |
| 2000–2002 | VfL Wolfsburg | 49 | (8) |
| 2002–2008 | SV Mattersburg | 181 | (24) |
| Total | | 547 | (74) |

International career
| 1992–2005 | Austria | 55 | (5) |

Managerial career
- 2008–2010: Trenkwalder Admira II
- 2010–2013: FC Admira Mödling
- 2013–2015: Wolfsberger AC
- 2018: SKN St. Pölten
- 2018–2021: Rapid Wien
- 2022–2023: LASK
- 2024–2025: Wolfsberger AC
- 2025–: LASK
- * Club domestic league appearances and goals

Dietmar Kühbauer (born 4 April 1971), commonly known as Didi Kühbauer, is an Austrian professional football manager and former player who is the head coach of Austrian Bundesliga club LASK. As a player, he is best remembered for his years at Rapid Wien, where he won the Austrian Bundesliga and the Austrian Cup and appeared in the 1995–96 UEFA Cup Winners' Cup final. He was named to Rapid's Team of the Century in 1999 and earned 55 caps for the Austria national team, representing his country at the 1998 FIFA World Cup.

Born in Heiligenkreuz im Lafnitztal, Burgenland, Kühbauer began his professional career at Admira/Wacker in 1987 at the age of 16 before joining Rapid Wien in 1992. After five years in Vienna, during which he became one of the most prominent players in Austrian football, he moved abroad—first to Real Sociedad in La Liga in 1997 and later to VfL Wolfsburg in the Bundesliga in 2000. He returned to Austria in 2002, finishing his playing career at his childhood club SV Mattersburg in 2008.

Kühbauer began his managerial career at Admira Wacker, leading the club to promotion to the Austrian Bundesliga after winning the 2. Liga title in 2010–11. He subsequently managed Wolfsberger AC, SKN St. Pölten and Rapid Wien before a first spell at LASK in 2022–23, where he guided the club to a third-place finish and a return to European competition. In his second spell at Wolfsberger AC, Kühbauer led the club to their first major honour when they won the Austrian Cup in 2025, and he was named Austrian Coach of the Year. He departed WAC in October 2025 to return to LASK for a second time, leading them to their first Austrian Cup title in 61 years—in the process becoming the first manager in history to win the Austrian Cup in consecutive seasons with different clubs.

== Club career ==
Born in Heiligenkreuz, Burgenland, Kühbauer began his professional career at Admira Wacker, making his Austrian Bundesliga debut in 1987 at the age of 16. After five years at Wacker, he moved to city rivals Rapid Wien, where he won both a league title in 1996 and a domestic cup in 1995, forming a formidable midfield partnership with Peter Stöger, Andreas Heraf, Stephan Marasek and Zoran Barišić. He also played in the 1996 UEFA Cup Winners' Cup final against Paris Saint-Germain in Brussels, which Rapid lost. "Don Didi" remains a fan favorite at Rapid, and in 1999, he was named to the club's Team of the Century.

In the 1996-97 season, Kühbauer once again performed well for Rapid, scoring 11 goals, although the Vienna club lost the title to Austria Salzburg and after the death of his wife Michaela, he decided to move to Spain and join Real Sociedad. In 2000, he signed with German Bundesliga club VfL Wolfsburg. Kühbauer, who had desired a return to Rapid, eventually chose to return to SV Mattersburg due to being offered a low salary at his former club. As captain of the club, Kühbauer led Mattersburg to the finals of the 2005-06 Austrian Cup where they lost to Austria Wien and helped them reach third place in the 2006-07 season.

== International career ==
He made his debut for Austria in a May 1992 friendly match against Poland and was a participant at the 1998 FIFA World Cup. He earned 55 caps, scoring five goals. On 4 September 2005, he announced his retirement from international matches. His final international was a September 2005 World Cup qualification match against Poland.

== Coaching career ==
=== Admira Wacker ===
On 18 November 2008, he signed a contract by Trenkwalder Admira II as head coach. In 2010, he became coach of the first squad and led the team to the promotion to the Austrian Football Bundesliga.

=== Wolfsberger AC ===
From September 2013 to November 2015 he was head coach of Wolfsberger AC.

=== SKN St. Pölten and Rapid Wien ===
On 1 October 2018, Kühbauer was announced to become the new head coach of Rapid Wien, after only a half year at SKN St. Pölten.

=== LASK ===
In May 2022, Kühbauer was appointed head coach of LASK, signing a contract until June 2024. He finished the 2021–22 season with the Schwarz-Weißen in eighth place. The 2022–23 season saw significant improvement, as Kühbauer led the team to a third-place finish, securing their return to European competition. However, he was replaced by Thomas Sageder at the end of the season, due to differences of opinion regarding squad planning for the next season.

=== Return to Wolfsberger AC ===
In May 2024, Kühbauer was appointed head coach of Wolfsberger AC for a second time, succeeding Manfred Schmid ahead of the 2024–25 season. After an uncertain start to the campaign during which Kühbauer adapted his preferred system to better suit the squad, WAC recovered to mount a sustained challenge in the Bundesliga, remaining in contention for the title until the final matchday before finishing fourth. On 1 May 2025, Kühbauer guided the club to their first major honour in their history when WAC defeated TSV Hartberg 1–0 in the Austrian Cup final. He was subsequently voted Austrian Coach of the Year, an award determined by a ballot of club presidents, sporting directors and head coaches across the Bundesliga. Despite WAC's strong position in the table, Kühbauer departed the club in October 2025 to return to LASK.

=== Return to LASK ===
Kühbauer joined LASK mid-season during the 2025–26 season, taking charge of a club that had gone through four head coaches in the preceding twelve months. He led the club from tenth place to third in his first 14 league matches in charge, and guided LASK to the Austrian Cup final. On 1 May 2026, LASK defeated Rheindorf Altach 4–2 after extra time in Klagenfurt to win the Austrian Cup for the first time in 61 years, with Kühbauer becoming the first manager to win the trophy in consecutive seasons with different clubs. He later completed the domestic double after guiding LASK to the Austrian Bundesliga title on the final matchday of the season, secured with a 3–0 away victory over Austria Wien. It marked the club's second league championship and first since 1965.

== Personal life ==
On 16 February 1997, Kühbauer's pregnant wife, Michaela, was driving to Vienna International Airport to pick him up after Rapid's winter break in Dubai. Tragedy struck when her car veered off the road near Eisenstadt, and she was rushed to the hospital with three ribs puncturing her lung. She fell into a coma and died seven months later, on 13 September 1997. A disillusioned Kühbauer then left Austria to begin a new career abroad at Real Sociedad.

== Career statistics ==
=== Club ===
Appearances and goals by club, season and competition
| Club | Season | League | | | National cup (Note: Includes Austrian Cup, Copa del Rey, DFB-Pokal) | | Europe | | Other | | Total | |
| Club | Season | Division | Apps | Goals | Apps | Goals | Apps | Goals | Apps | Goals | Apps | Goals |
|---|---|---|---|---|---|---|---|---|---|---|---|---|
| Admira/Wacker | 1987–88 | Austrian Bundesliga | 12 | 0 | 0 | 0 | — | | — | | 12 | 0 |
| Admira/Wacker | 1988–89 | Austrian Bundesliga | 23 | 0 | 4 | 0 | 5 (Note: Appearances in Intertoto Cup) | 2 | — | | 32 | 2 |
| Admira/Wacker | 1989–90 | Austrian Bundesliga | 26 | 1 | 1 | 0 | 6 (Note: Three appearances in Intertoto Cup, three appearances in European Cup Winners' Cup) | 0 | — | | 33 | 1 |
| Admira/Wacker | 1990–91 | Austrian Bundesliga | 25 | 0 | 0 | 0 | 9 (Note: Five appearances and one goal in Intertoto Cup, four appearances in UEFA Cup) | 1 | — | | 34 | 1 |
| Admira/Wacker | 1991–92 | Austrian Bundesliga | 35 | 6 | 5 | 1 | — | | — | | 40 | 7 |
| Admira/Wacker | Total | | 121 | 7 | 10 | 1 | 20 | 3 | — | | 151 | 11 |
| Rapid Wien | 1992–93 | Austrian Bundesliga | 33 | 3 | 5 | 0 | 1 | 0 | — | | 39 | 3 |
| Rapid Wien | 1993–94 | Austrian Bundesliga | 31 | 6 | 3 | 3 | 3 | 2 | — | | 37 | 11 |
| Rapid Wien | 1994–95 | Austrian Bundesliga | 27 | 7 | 4 | 1 | 3 | 0 | — | | 34 | 8 |
| Rapid Wien | 1995–96 | Austrian Bundesliga | 26 | 6 | 2 | 0 | 5 (Note: Appearances in UEFA Cup Winners' Cup) | 1 | — | | 33 | 7 |
| Rapid Wien | 1996–97 | Austrian Bundesliga | 31 | 11 | 1 | 0 | 8 (Note: Appearances in UEFA Champions League) | 1 | 1 (Note: Appearance in Austrian Supercup) | 0 | 41 | 12 |
| Rapid Wien | Total | | 148 | 33 | 15 | 4 | 20 | 4 | 1 | 0 | 184 | 41 |
| Real Sociedad | 1997–98 | La Liga | 20 | 2 | 2 | 0 | — | | — | | 22 | 2 |
| Real Sociedad | 1998–99 | La Liga | 16 | 0 | 0 | 0 | 5 (Note: Appearances in UEFA Cup) | 0 | — | | 21 | 0 |
| Real Sociedad | 1999–2000 | La Liga | 12 | 0 | 1 | 0 | — | | — | | 13 | 0 |
| Real Sociedad | Total | | 48 | 2 | 3 | 0 | 5 | 0 | — | | 56 | 2 |
| VfL Wolfsburg | 2000–01 | Bundesliga | 28 | 7 | 2 | 0 | 3 | 0 | — | | 33 | 7 |
| VfL Wolfsburg | 2001–02 | Bundesliga | 21 | 1 | 2 | 0 | 3 | 0 | — | | 26 | 1 |
| VfL Wolfsburg | Total | | 49 | 8 | 4 | 0 | 6 | 0 | — | | 59 | 8 |
| SV Mattersburg | 2002–03 | Erste Liga | 29 | 2 | 3 | 0 | — | | — | | 32 | 2 |
| SV Mattersburg | 2003–04 | Austrian Bundesliga | 32 | 10 | 3 | 0 | — | | — | | 35 | 10 |
| SV Mattersburg | 2004–05 | Austrian Bundesliga | 32 | 7 | 2 | 0 | — | | — | | 34 | 7 |
| SV Mattersburg | 2005–06 | Austrian Bundesliga | 32 | 1 | 5 | 0 | — | | — | | 37 | 1 |
| SV Mattersburg | 2006–07 | Austrian Bundesliga | 27 | 2 | 4 | 1 | 2 | 0 | — | | 33 | 3 |
| SV Mattersburg | 2007–08 | Austrian Bundesliga | 29 | 2 | 0 | 0 | 4 | 0 | — | | 33 | 2 |
| SV Mattersburg | Total | | 181 | 24 | 17 | 1 | 6 | 0 | — | | 204 | 25 |
| Career total | | | 547 | 74 | 49 | 16 | 57 | 7 | 1 | 0 | 654 | 97 |

=== International ===
Appearances and goals by national team and year
| National team | Year | Apps | Goals |
|---|---|---|---|
| Austria | 1992 | 4 | 0 |
| Austria | 1993 | 5 | 2 |
| Austria | 1994 | 3 | 0 |
| Austria | 1995 | 6 | 1 |
| Austria | 1996 | 2 | 0 |
| Austria | 1997 | 3 | 0 |
| Austria | 1998 | 11 | 1 |
| Austria | 1999 | 3 | 0 |
| Austria | 2000 | 5 | 1 |
| Austria | 2001 | 5 | 0 |
| Austria | 2002 | 0 | 0 |
| Austria | 2003 | 0 | 0 |
| Austria | 2004 | 5 | 0 |
| Austria | 2005 | 3 | 0 |
| Total | | 55 | 5 |

Scores and results list Austria's goal tally first, score column indicates score after each Kühbauer goal

List of international goals scored by Dietmar Kühbauer
| No. | Date | Venue | Opponent | Score | Result | Competition |
|---|---|---|---|---|---|---|
| 1 | 14 April 1993 | Ernst-Happel-Stadion, Vienna, Austria | Bulgaria | 2–0 | 3–1 | 1994 World Cup qualifier |
| 2 | 25 August 1993 | Ernst-Happel-Stadion, Vienna, Austria | Finland | 1–0 | 3–0 | 1994 World Cup qualifier |
| 3 | 26 April 1995 | Stadion Lehen, Salzburg, Austria | Liechtenstein | 1–0 | 7–0 | Euro 1996 qualifier |
| 4 | 2 June 1998 | Ernst-Happel-Stadion, Vienna, Austria | Liechtenstein | 2–0 | 6–0 | Friendly |
| 5 | 1 September 2000 | Ernst-Happel-Stadion, Vienna, Austria | Iran | 4–1 | 5–1 | Friendly |

=== Managerial ===
As of match played 21 November 2026

Managerial record by team and tenure
| Team | Nation | From | To | Record | | | | | Ref |
| Team | Nation | From | To | G | W | D | L | Win % | Ref |
|---|---|---|---|---|---|---|---|---|---|
| Admira Wacker II | (Austria) | 1 December 2008 | 26 April 2010 | 41 | 23 | 6 | 12 | 56.10 | |
| Admira Wacker | (Austria) | 26 April 2010 | 11 June 2013 | 124 | 57 | 26 | 41 | 45.97 | |
| Wolfsberger AC | (Austria) | 2 September 2013 | 25 November 2015 | 95 | 39 | 14 | 42 | 41.05 | |
| SKN St. Pölten | (Austria) | 1 April 2018 | 1 October 2018 | 21 | 12 | 4 | 5 | 57.14 | |
| Rapid Wien | (Austria) | 1 October 2018 | 10 November 2021 | 141 | 69 | 26 | 46 | 48.94 | |
| LASK | (Austria) | 3 May 2022 | 6 June 2023 | 40 | 19 | 14 | 7 | 47.50 | |
| Wolfsberger AC | (Austria) | 1 July 2024 | 9 October 2025 | 56 | 30 | 12 | 14 | 53.57 | |
| LASK | (Austria) | 9 October 2025 | Present | 49 | 34 | 7 | 8 | 69.39 | |
| Total | | | | 567 | 283 | 109 | 175 | 49.91 | — |

== Honours ==
=== Player ===
Rapid Wien

- Austrian Bundesliga: 1995–96
- Austrian Cup: 1994–95

=== Manager ===
Admira Wacker

- 2. Liga: 2010–11

Wolfsberger AC

- Austrian Cup: 2024–25

LASK

- Austrian Bundesliga: 2025–26
- Austrian Cup: 2025–26
