= 1995–96 Austrian Cup =

Tournament details
- Country: Austria

Final positions
- Champions: Sturm Graz
- Runners-up: Admira/Wacker

The 1995–96 Austrian Cup (German: ÖFB-Cup) was the 62nd season of Austria's nationwide football cup competition. The final was held at the Ernst-Happel-Stadion, Vienna on 5 June 1996.

The competition was won by Sturm Graz after beating Admira/Wacker 3–1.

== First round ==
Team 1	Score	Team 2
1 August 1995
Austria Klagenfurt	1–0	FC St. Veit
2 August 1995
SV Feldkirchen	1–0 (a.e.t.)	SV Ebental
Union Matrei	1–2	Villacher SV
WSG Wietersdorf	1–3	SAK Klagenfurt
Wolfsberger AC	0–1	SV Lendorf
4 August 1995
Eintracht Wels	3–4	SV Traun
SC Eisenstadt	1–1 (a.e.t.) (3–4 p)	ASK Baumgarten
SC/ESV Parndorf 1919	3–0	SV Sigleß
5 August 1995
FC Deutschkreutz	2–0	SV Rohrbach
SC Marchtrenk	4–1	ATSV Lenzing
UFC Tadten	0–3	SV Mattersburg
11 August 1995
SK Altheim	2–3 (a.e.t.)	Union Esternberg
Donau Linz	3–0	Union Rohrbach/Berg
12 August 1995
FC ÖMV Stadlau	1–2	Gerasdorf/Wiener Sportclub
Union St. Florian	1–2	Union Vöcklamarkt
15 August 1995
1. SC Wiener Neustadt	1–2	ASK Kottingbrunn
ASK-BSC Bruck/Leitha	2–0	EPSV Gmünd
ASK Hirm	2–5 (a.e.t.)	ASK Klingenbach
ASK Voitsberg	2–0	SV Gratkorn
ATSV Sattledt	0–1	SV Braunau
FC Dornbirn	2–7	FC Hard
FC ÖMV Stadlau	0–1	First Vienna FC
Floridsdorfer AC	1–7	SV Gerasdorf
ISS Admira Landhaus	2–1	KDAG Phönix Wien
Kremser SC	1–2	SV Stockerau
LUV Graz	0–4	SV Flavia Solva
Rot-Weiß Rankweil	1–5	SC Austria Lustenau
SC Himberg	0–1 (a.e.t.)	1. SV Wiener Neudorf
SC Kundl	4–0	WSG Wattens
SC Rheindorf Altach	1–1 (a.e.t.) (4–5 p)	Schwarz-Weiß Bregenz
SC Untersiebenbrunn	3–1	SV Oberndorf
SC Zwettl	1–0	VSE St. Pölten
SK St. Magdalena	3–4	FC Linz
SPG Brixlegg/Rattenberg	1–1 (a.e.t.) (1–3 p)	SV Fügen
SPG Rum	0–2	FC Kufstein
SV Alpine Kindberg	0–1	ASK Köflach
SV Axams	0–1	SV Wörgl
Deutschlandsberger SC	3–6	DSV Leoben
SV Essling	3–1	SC Gaswerk/Straßenbahn
Gersthofer SV	3–2	Wacker Wien
SV Grieskirchen	0–1	FC Waidhofen/Ybbs
SV Hall	1–4	Wacker Innsbruck Amateure
SV Horn	0–6	VfB Mödling
SV Leibnitz	1–1 (a.e.t.) (3–2 p)	SV Feldbach
SV Schwechat	2–0	Favoritner AC
TSV Hartberg	2–1	Kapfenberger SV
USK Rottenmann	0–1	SV Eibiswald
Wiener Sport-Club	0–4	SV Oberwart
16 August 1995
FC Koblach	0–1	VfB Hohenems
SR Donaufeld	2–1 (a.e.t.)	Prater SV/Vindobona
22 August 1995
ATSV Trimmelkam	3–1	FC Zell am See
FC Salzburg	1–3	FC Puch
SK Mittersill	1–4	ESV Saalfelden
SV Wals-Grünau	1–4	SV Spittal/Drau
USK Anif	2–3	ÖTSU Henndorf

== Second round ==
Team 1	Score	Team 2
7 September 1995
SC/ESV Parndorf 1919	1–0	SC Kundl
8 September 1995
1. SV Wiener Neudorf	1–4	SV Oberwart
ASK Köflach	1–0 (a.e.t.)	Union Vöcklamarkt
SV Schwechat	0–2	SV Gerasdorf
SV Stockerau	0–3	First Vienna FC
TSV Hartberg	0–1	SV Flavia Solva
9 September 1995
ASK Baumgarten	1–6	SK Rapid Wien
ASK Voitsberg	3–0	SAK Klagenfurt
ATSV Trimmelkam	1–8	FC Tirol Innsbruck
Austria Klagenfurt	2–2 (a.e.t.) (4–3 p)	Donau Linz
ESV Saalfelden	0–2 (a.e.t.)	FC Kufstein
FC Deutschkreuz	0–2	VfB Mödling
FC Puch	1–2	SC Austria Lustenau
FC Waidhofen/Ybbs	2–0 (a.e.t.)	ASK Kottingbrunn
FC Hard	2–1	SV Braunau
SC Kundl	2–0	SV Wörgl
SC Marchtrenk	0–5	SK Sturm Graz
SC Untersiebenbrunn	3–1 (a.e.t.)	ISS Admira Landhaus
SC Zwettl	0–3	Admira/Wacker
SR Donaufeld	0–0 (a.e.t.) (3–5 p)	ASK Klingenbach
SV Eibiswald	0–5	FC Linz
SV Feldkirchen	0–1	SV Ried
SV Fügen	2–5	VfB Hohenems
Gersthofer SV	1–0	SV Essling
SV Leibnitz	1–2	LASK
SV Lendorf	1–3 (a.e.t.)	Grazer AK
SV Mattersburg	0–1 (a.e.t.)	FK Austria Wien
SV Traun	1–3	SK Vorwärts Steyr
Schwarz-Weiß Bregenz	7–1	ÖTSU Henndorf
Union Esternberg	0–3	DSV Leoben
Villacher SV	1–2 (a.e.t.)	SV Spittal/Drau
Wacker Innsbruck Amateure	0–5	SV Austria Salzburg

== Third round ==
Team 1	Score	Team 2
29 September 1995
Austria Klagenfurt	1–3	DSV Leoben
FC Waidhofen/Ybbs	2–6	FK Austria Wien
SC Kundl	2–0	FC Kufstein
SC/ESV Parndorf 1919	0–3	SV Gerasdorf
SV Oberwart	0–1	LASK
SV Ried	2–3	SV Austria Salzburg
Schwarz-Weiß Bregenz	2–7	Grazer AK
30 September 1995
ASK Köflach	2–3	ASK Klingenbach
ASK Voitsberg	1–3	VfB Mödling
Admira/Wacker	4–1	SK Rapid Wien
SC Austria Lustenau	0–2	FC Linz
FC Tirol Innsbruck	2–5	SK Sturm Graz
FC Hard	2–1	SV Spittal/Drau
SC Untersiebenbrunn	0–1	SK Vorwärts Steyr
Gersthofer SV	0–6	First Vienna FC
VfB Hohenems	2–5	SV Flavia Solva

== Fourth round ==
Team 1	Score	Team 2
24 October 1995
SV Gerasdorf	1–0	ASK Klingenbach
First Vienna FC	0–3	Admira/Wacker
25 October 1995
FK Austria Wien	0–1	SK Sturm Graz
FC Linz	1–2	SK Vorwärts Steyr
SC Kundl	4–3	DSV Leoben
26 October 1995
SV Flavia Solva	1–0	LASK
Grazer AK	2–0	SV Austria Salzburg
FC Hard	1–0	VfB Mödling

== Quarter-finals ==
Team 1	Score	Team 2
25 November 1995
SV Flavia Solva	0–3 (a.e.t.)	Admira/Wacker
FC Hard	0–1 (a.e.t.)	SK Vorwärts Steyr
SC Kundl	0–1	Grazer AK
SV Gerasdorf	1–2	SK Sturm Graz

== Semi-finals ==
Team 1	Score	Team 2
7 May 1996
Admira/Wacker	2–0	SK Vorwärts Steyr
SK Sturm Graz	3–1	Grazer AK

== Final ==
5 June 1996
20:30

SK Sturm Graz	3–1	Admira/Wacker
Milanič 31'; Wetl 59', 67'	Report	Ogris 74'

Ernst-Happel-Stadion, Vienna
Attendance: 8,800
Referee: Konrad Plautz
