= Gareth Turnbull (football coach) =

Gareth Nevin Turnbull is a New Zealand association football coach. He is the Football Pathways Manager at Melbourne Victory in the A-League Women, having previously served as an assistant coach of the club's women's team. His coaching career has included two National Women's League championships with Mainland Pride, coaching New Zealand at two FIFA women's youth World Cups, serving as an assistant coach of the Football Ferns, and two A-League Women championships with Melbourne Victory.

Gareth Turnbull Football Coach

== Early life and education ==
Turnbull grew up on Auckland's North Shore, before his family moved to Christchurch. He attended Canterbury University, completing a Bachelor of Sport Coaching degree. He subsequently attended Catawba College in North Carolina, United States, on a football scholarship.

== Playing career ==
Turnbull played in New Zealand's domestic football competitions, including the Mainland Premier League, where he became the competition's all-time leading goalscorer with 94 career goals. His record stood until it was broken by Michael White in 2017.

His playing career increasingly transitioned towards coaching, and from 2011 he moved into coaching on a full-time basis.

== Coaching career ==
=== Mainland Football & Coastal Spirit ===
Turnbull began his coaching career in Mainland Football's youth development programmes before becoming Football Development Manager at Coastal Spirit Football Club in 2007.

He subsequently became head coach of Coastal Spirit's women's premier team, where he developed a successful women's programme before moving into national-level coaching.

=== Mainland Pride (2012 - 2014) ===
Turnbull was appointed head coach of Mainland Pride in New Zealand's National Women's League midway through the 2012 season.

In 2013, Turnbull led Mainland Pride to the National Women's League championship, defeating Northern Football 4–2 in the final.

Mainland Pride successfully defended the championship in 2014 under Turnbull, defeating New Zealand Football Development 3–1 in the final. The consecutive championships were followed by Turnbull's appointment to the New Zealand national age-group coaching programme.

=== New Zealand Football (2015 - 2019) ===
In March 2015, Turnbull was appointed head coach of the New Zealand women's under-17 team.

Turnbull led the New Zealand under-17 team at the 2016 FIFA U-17 Women's World Cup in Jordan. New Zealand recorded a 5–0 victory over the hosts in the group stage, one of the standout results of Turnbull's international coaching career.

Turnbull was subsequently appointed head coach of the New Zealand women's under-20 team and manager of New Zealand Football's Future Ferns Domestic Programme (FFDP). The FFDP was an academy-style programme designed to develop domestic-based players towards the Football Ferns.

Under Turnbull, the FFDP provided a high-performance environment for domestic-based players while allowing them to balance football with education, employment and other commitments. During his tenure, the programme produced a number of players who progressed to professional contracts overseas.

Turnbull led the New Zealand under-20 team at the 2018 FIFA U-20 Women's World Cup in France. New Zealand opened the tournament against the Netherlands before facing hosts France. In their second group match, New Zealand recorded a 0–0 draw against France, with Turnbull describing the match as a significant challenge against a team containing a number of professional players. The result was one of the highlights of Turnbull's time with New Zealand Football.

Turnbull's work with the senior Football Ferns began in 2017. Following the resignation of head coach Tony Readings, Turnbull and New Zealand Football Technical Director Andreas Heraf were appointed interim co-coaches for the team's two-match tour of Thailand.

The Football Ferns drew 0–0 with Thailand in the opening match before recording a 5–0 victory in the second match in Bangkok. The win was New Zealand's biggest victory over opposition from outside Oceania since 1993. Turnbull described the 5–0 result as a significant achievement and praised the team's tactical application and high pressing.

Following the successful Thailand tour, Andreas Heraf was appointed permanent head coach of the Football Ferns, with Turnbull appointed as his assistant. FIFA reported that Turnbull, who was also the New Zealand under-20 coach, would serve as Heraf's assistant as the team prepared for the 2019 FIFA Women's World Cup.

As Football Ferns assistant coach, Turnbull was involved in the team's international programme during 2018, including two international friendlies against Scotland in Spain. New Zealand Football identified the matches as part of the team's preparation for the 2019 FIFA Women's World Cup and reported Turnbull alongside Heraf as part of the coaching staff.

Turnbull continued to combine his Football Ferns role with his responsibilities as head coach of the New Zealand under-20 team and manager of the FFDP. New Zealand Football later reported that he was also involved in the development of players who subsequently progressed to professional football, including several FFDP graduates who secured professional contracts overseas.

Reflecting on his four years with New Zealand Football, Turnbull identified the 5–0 victory over Thailand with the Football Ferns as a particular highlight of his time with the organisation. He also highlighted his experiences at the 2016 FIFA U-17 Women's World Cup in Jordan and the 2018 FIFA U-20 Women's World Cup in France, particularly the 0–0 draw with hosts France.

Turnbull left New Zealand Football in 2019 after four years with the organisation.

=== Melbourne Victory (2019–present) ===
Turnbull joined Melbourne Victory ahead of the 2019–20 A-League Women season, working as an assistant coach with head coach Jeff Hopkins.

As part of the Melbourne Victory coaching staff, Turnbull was involved in the club's championship-winning 2020–21 season. Victory defeated Sydney FC 1–0 after extra time in the Grand Final to claim the A-League Women's Championship.

Victory successfully defended the championship the following season, defeating Sydney FC 2–1 in the 2021–22 A-League Women Grand Final. The result made Melbourne Victory only the second club to win consecutive A-League Women championships. Turnbull was part of the club's coaching staff during both championship campaigns.

In addition to his senior team responsibilities, Turnbull leads the player development and pathway roles at Melbourne Victory. He was involved in the development of the club's women's pathway programmes and continued to combine coaching with responsibility for player development.

Turnbull remains the Melbourne Victory's Football Pathways Manager.
