= Christian Prosenik =

Austrian footballer and manager

Personal information
- Date of birth: 7 June 1968 (age 58)
- Place of birth: Vienna, Austria
- Height: 1.80 m (5 ft 11 in)
- Position: Midfielder

Youth career
- 1. Simmeringer SC

Senior career*
Years	Team	Apps	(Gls)
1986–1995	Austria Wien	258	(24)
1995–1996	Austria Salzburg	36	(3)
1996–1999	Rapid Wien	86	(9)
1999–2000	1860 Munich	19	(1)
2000–2001	Austria Wien	9	(0)
2001–2002	First Vienna	18	(1)
2002–2003	Wiener Sportklub	29	(1)

International career
	Austria	24	(1)

Managerial career
- 2004: SV Schwechat
- 2005–2010: Rapid Wien (youth team)
- 2010–2011: FAC Team für Wien
- 2012: 1. Simmeringer SC
- 2013–2016: SV Leobendorf
- * Club domestic league appearances and goals

Christian Prosenik (born 7 June 1968) is a retired Austrian football midfielder and a football manager.

== Personal ==
Christian Prosenik is the father of professional football player Philipp Prosenik.
