= Andreas Heraf =

Austrian footballer and manager

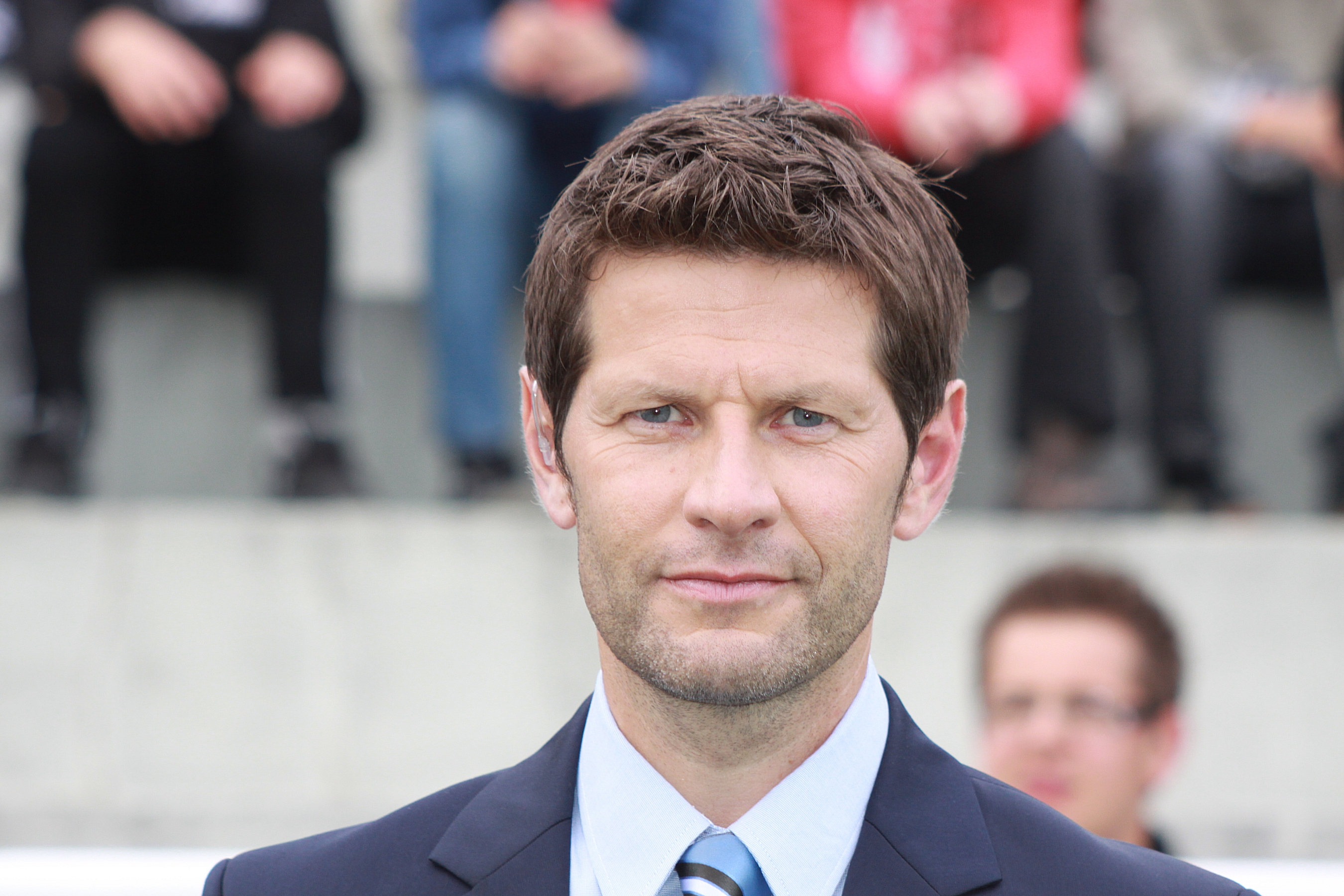

Personal information
- Date of birth: 10 September 1967 (age 59)
- Place of birth: Vienna, Austria
- Height: 1.76 m (5 ft 9 in)
- Position: Midfielder

Youth career
- Graphia Wien

Senior career*
Years	Team	Apps	(Gls)
1985–1988	Rapid Wien	55	(6)
1988–1990	First Vienna	76	(19)
1991	Austria Salzburg	11	(4)
1991–1994	Vorwärts Steyr	80	(23)
1994	Hannover 96	17	(3)
1995–1999	Rapid Wien	135	(21)
2000–2001	Kärnten	30	(0)
Total		404	(76)

International career
1996–1998	Austria	11	(1)

Managerial career
- 2001–2002: 1. FC Saarbrücken
- 2003–2005: Austria Lustenau
- 2005: SC Schwanenstadt
- 2006: FC Superfund
- 2006–2007: SC Schwanenstadt
- 2007–2008: SC-ESV Parndorf 1919
- 2008–2015: Austria U20
- 2015–2017: Austria U17
- 2017–2018: New Zealand women (Note: Heraf first served as interim head coach for two matches in November 2017, alongside Gareth Turnbull. Heraf was officially appointed as New Zealand's head coach on 20 December 2017, with Turnbull appointed as assistant.)
- 2018–2019: Floridsdorfer AC
- 2021: SV Ried
- 2021-2022: Türkgücü München
- 2022–2023: Schwarz-Weiß Bregenz
- 2023–2024: SC Austria Lustenau
- 2024: BFC Dynamo
- * Club domestic league appearances and goals

Andreas Heraf (born 10 September 1967) is an Austrian football manager and former player who last served as head coach for the German Regionalliga team BFC Dynamo. He was previously the technical director for New Zealand Football and head coach for the New Zealand women's national team.

== Club career ==
A defensive midfielder, Heraf started his professional playing career at Rapid Wien and moved to city rivals First Vienna in 1988. He then had half a season at Austria Salzburg, before joining Vorwärts Steyr. After another half season at German Second division side Hannover 96, he returned to Rapid Wien. In his first season back, the longhaired Heraf played in the 1995–96 UEFA Cup Winners Cup Final against Paris St Germain in Brussels, which Rapid lost. He finished his career at FC Kärnten.

== International career ==
Heraf made his debut for the Austria national team in an April 1996 friendly match against Hungary and was a participant at the 1998 FIFA World Cup but he did not play. He earned 11 caps. His first and only goal he scored versus Latvia 1997. Herafs last international was an October 1998 World Cup qualification match against San Marino.

== Managerial career ==
After retiring, he became a manager. His clubs were Austria Lustenau, SC Schwanenstadt, FC Superfund and SC Schwanenstadt again. After a few months at SC-ESV Parndorf 1919, he joined the Austrian U-20 set-up.

=== New Zealand women's national team ===
On 24 April 2017, Heraf was announced as the New Zealand Football technical director. Later that same year, he also become the coach for the New Zealand women's national team.

After the Football Ferns lost to Japan in June 2018, there was calls for Heraf to resign following his comments in the post match press conference, including that the team would never have the quality to compete with other teams and the size of New Zealand meant they could not compete. He later stated he was misunderstood and that he would not resign. On 19 June, a letter of complaint signed by at least ten players was sent to New Zealand Football, collated by the New Zealand Professional Footballers' Association. Later that day, it was also announced that New Zealand Football were deliberately flouting a FIFA directive that Heraf should not be in charge of both roles at the same organisation.

On 20 June, it emerged that the Players' Union had sent a strongly worded letter to New Zealand Football, instructing them to discontinue all communications with players, after Heraf and other New Zealand Football staff members were contacting players and strongly encouraging them not to write letters or issue any formal complaints. That afternoon, it was announced that Heraf would be placed on special leave while an independent investigation was conducted into the allegations around bullying, intimidation and a culture of fear.

On 31 July, it was announced that Heraf and New Zealand Football parted ways and that he would leave by the end of the week, after thirteen players refused to play and complained about him.

=== Return to Europe ===
After several years at Floridsdorfer AC and SV Ried, he joined Türkgücü München in December 2021. On 24 December 2022, Heraf was appointed manager of Eliteliga Vorarlberg club Schwarz-Weiß Bregenz.

Heraf was announced as the next head coach of the German Regionalliga team, and former East German record champion, BFC Dynamo on 25 April 2024. However, after only six matches of the 2024-25 Regionalliga Nordost, and only two months in office, Heraf had to resign for health reasons. BFC Dynamo reported that Heraf suffered from an acute herniated disc and had to seek medical treatment in Austria because the previous drug treatment had unfortunately not helped. The club announced on 2 September 2024 that his contract had been terminated.

== Honours ==
Rapid Wien

- Austrian Bundesliga: 1986–87, 1987–88, 1995–96
- Austrian Cup: 1986–87, 1987–88, 1994–95

FC Kärnten

- Austrian Cup: 2000–01
