= Maciej Śliwowski =

Polish footballer

Personal information
- Full name: Maciej Śliwowski
- Date of birth: 10 January 1967 (age 59)
- Place of birth: Warsaw, Poland
- Height: 1.73 m (5 ft 8 in)
- Position: Forward

Senior career*
Years	Team	Apps	(Gls)
1985–1990	Stal Mielec	100	(26)
1990–1991	VfL Bochum	0	(0)
1991–1992	Zagłębie Lubin	27	(7)
1992–1993	Legia Warsaw	38	(28)
1993–1996	Rapid Wien	71	(21)
1996–1997	Tirol Innsbruck	33	(5)
1997–1998	Admira Wacker Mödling	27	(8)
1998–1999	Ried	28	(3)
1999–2000	FCN St. Pölten		
2000	SV Hundsheim		

International career
1989–1993	Poland	9	(0)

Managerial career
- 2011: Znicz Pruszków
- 2014: Bzura Chodaków
- 2017–2018: Pilica Białobrzegi
- 2018–2020: Mszczonowianka Mszczonów
- 2020–2021: Mławianka Mława
- 2023: Okęcie Warsaw
- * Club domestic league appearances and goals

Maciej Śliwowski (born 10 January 1967) is a Polish football manager and former player who played as a forward. He was most recently in charge of Okęcie Warsaw

== Honours ==
Rapid Wien

- Austrian Bundesliga: 1995–96
- Austrian Cup: 1994–95
