= Michael Hatz =

Austrian footballer

Personal information
- Date of birth: 17 November 1970 (age 55)
- Place of birth: Vienna, Austria
- Height: 1.84 m (6 ft 0 in)
- Position: Defender

Youth career
- Rapid Wien

Senior career*
Years	Team	Apps	(Gls)
1990–1996	Rapid Wien	151	(8)
1996–1997	Reggiana	26	(0)
1998	Lecce	2	(0)
1998–2001	Rapid Wien	83	(3)
2001–2005	Admira Wacker Mödling	106	(3)

International career
1996–2000	Austria	9	(0)
- * Club domestic league appearances and goals

Michael Hatz (born 17 November 1970, in Vienna) is an Austrian former professional footballer who played as a defender. He made nine appearances for the Austria national team.

== Honours ==
Rapid Wien

- Austrian Football Bundesliga: 1995–96
- Austrian Cup: 1995
- UEFA Cup Winners' Cup runner-up: 1996
- UEFA Intertoto Cup: 1992, 1993
