= Peter Stöger =

Austrian footballer and manager

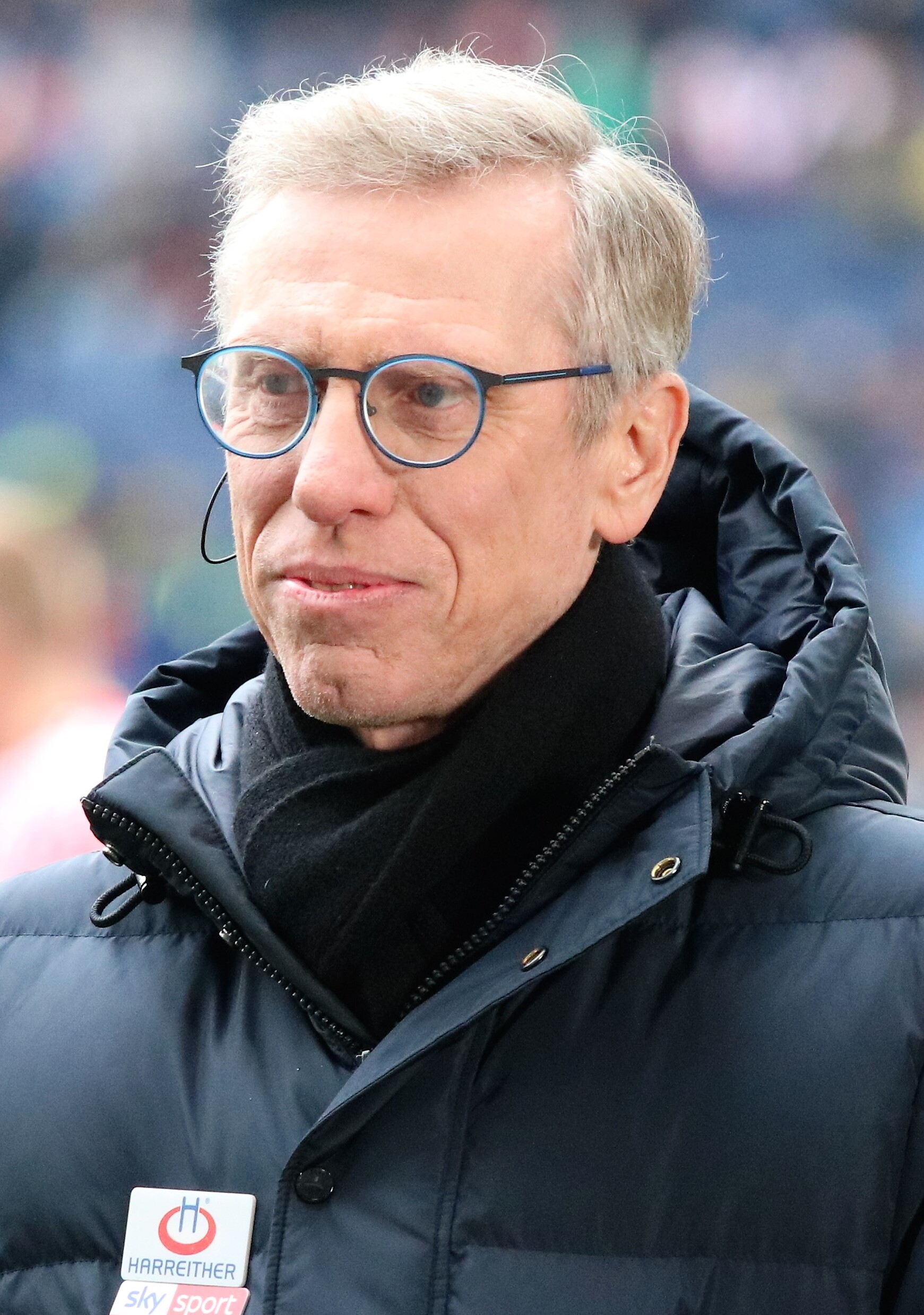
- Stöger in 2022

Personal information
- Date of birth: 11 April 1966 (age 60)
- Place of birth: Vienna, Austria
- Height: 1.76 m (5 ft 9 in)
- Position: Midfielder

Senior career*
Years	Team	Apps	(Gls)
1985–1986	Favoritner AC Wien		
1986–1987	Vorwärts Steyr	15	(0)
1987–1988	First Vienna	36	(6)
1988–1994	Austria Wien	181	(52)
1994–1995	Tirol Innsbruck	35	(6)
1995–1997	Rapid Wien	84	(17)
1997–1998	LASK Linz	32	(5)
1999–2000	Austria Wien	35	(4)
2000–2002	VfB Admira Wacker Mödling	47	(6)
2002–2004	Untersiebenbrunn	62	(29)
Total		527	(125)

International career
1988–1999	Austria	65	(15)

Managerial career
- 2005: Austria Wien
- 2007–2010: First Vienna
- 2010–2011: Grazer AK
- 2011–2012: Wiener Neustadt
- 2012–2013: Austria Wien
- 2013–2017: 1. FC Köln
- 2017–2018: Borussia Dortmund
- 2020–2021: Austria Wien
- 2021: Ferencváros
- 2025: Rapid Wien
- * Club domestic league appearances and goals

Peter Stöger (German pronunciation: [ˈpeːtɐ ˈʃtøːɡɐ]; born 11 April 1966) is an Austrian football coach and a former player.

As a player Stöger played as a midfielder and won the Austrian championship four times and the domestic cup three times playing for Austria Wien and Rapid Wien. As a coach or sporting director, Stöger won the Austrian championship twice and the Austrian Cup twice with Austria Wien; he also won promotion with 1. FC Köln, with four years at Austria Wien between 2013 and 2017, was his longest stint at one club.

== Club career ==
Stöger started his career at Favoritner AC Wien, and played six years for Austria Wien from 1988 through 1994, winning league three consecutive seasons, with teammates like Ralph Hasenhüttl. After a year at Tirol Innsbruck, he joined Rapid Wien in 1995 and won a league title with them. He also played in the 1996 UEFA Cup Winners Cup Final against Paris St Germain in Brussels, which Rapid lost. He then returned to Austria after a year at LASK Linz and finished his career at 38 years of age with Untersiebenbrunn.

== International career ==
He made his debut for Austria in February 1988 against Switzerland, missed out on the 1990 FIFA World Cup, but was a participant at the 1998 FIFA World Cup. He earned 65 caps, scoring 15 goals, including a hat-trick against Ireland in a Euro 96 qualifier in Vienna in September 1995. His last international was a March 1999 friendly match, also against Switzerland.

== Managerial career ==
=== Austria ===
Stöger, along with Frank Schinkels, became coach of Austria Wien on 6 May 2005 and was scheduled to end his role at the end of the season. However, Stöger continued in the position until December 2005, then became sporting director. After winning the championship in that season, the following season did not start well and both coach and manager were sacked before year's end. Stöger eventually moved for 3 years to First Vienna, then Grazer AK, and Wiener Neustadt. Stöger returned to manage Austria Wien on 30 May 2012, stayed for one year and celebrated the Austrian championship with a record number of points, despite Red Bull Salzburg investing much more money in Schmidt as a coach, Mané, Alan, Soriano and Kampl as players.

=== 1. FC Köln ===
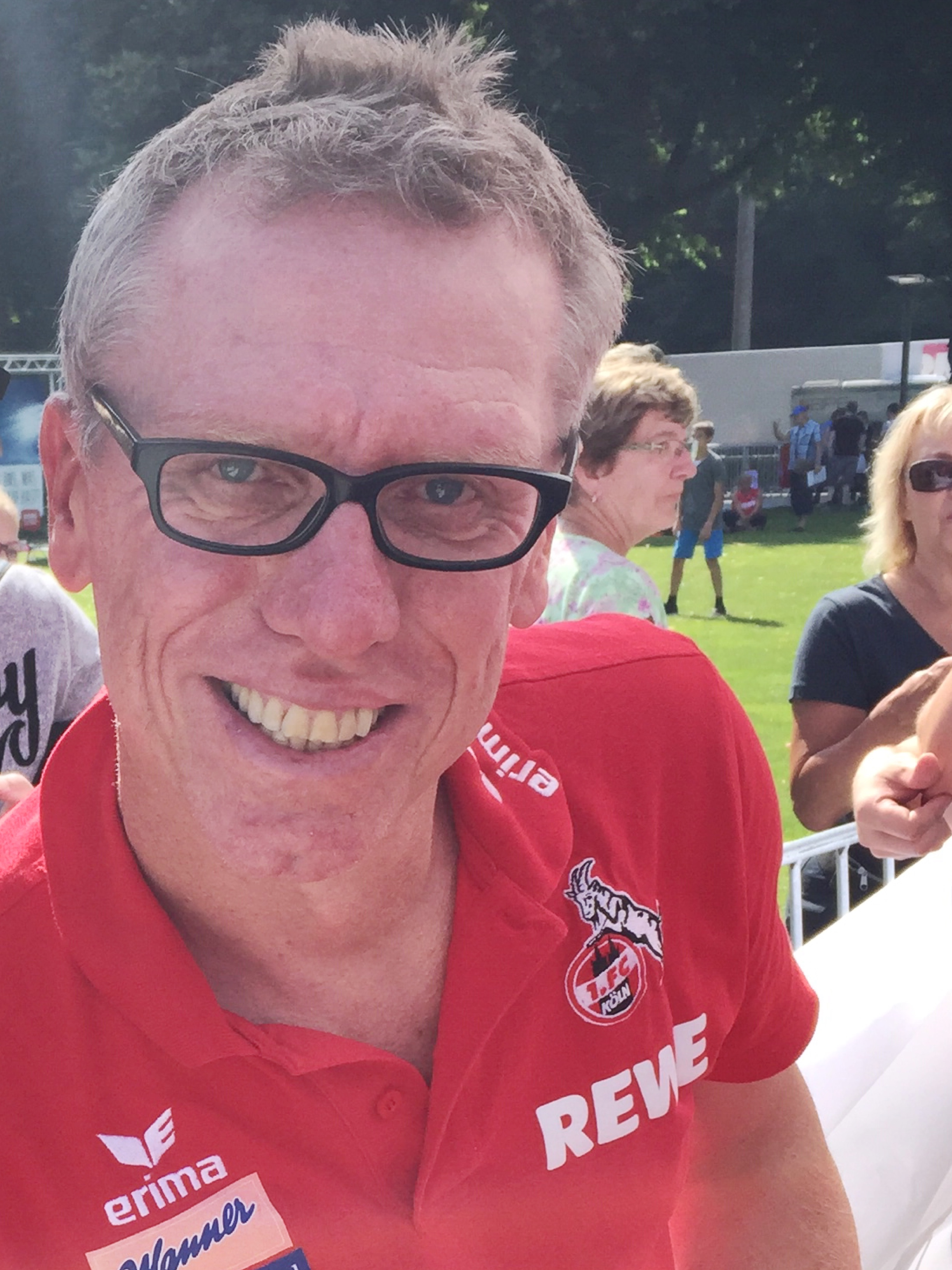
Stöger with Köln in 2016

Stöger and his co-trainer Manfred Schmid were bought out of their contracts for 700,000 EUR and a friendly, and thus started at 1. FC Köln on 11 June 2013. A couple of weeks later, Köln signed Jörg Schmadtke as co-CEO. The Billy Goats continuously improved under their tenure, from 33 points in the first half in the 2. Bundesliga, to 35 points in the second half, followed by promotion. The next half in the German top-flight ended with 19 points, followed by 22 points. The first half of 2015/16 ended with 24 points. In January 2016, Stöger, along with his co-trainer Manfred Schmid, let his contract be extended to 2020, including a buy-out clause. During the second half of the season, Köln was not as good, with 19 points, but finished on a single-digit rank for the first time in 24 years. In the season 2016/17, Köln reached 26 and 23 points, and was on the lucky end of the congestion for the places which brought international football back into the city after 25 years. Cologne finished 5th and qualified for the Europa League. In the 2017/18 season, Köln's poor start was the worst ever start to a Bundesliga season, with only three points from the opening 14 matches. In October, Schmadtke resigned. After a win against Arsenal in the Europa League, a loss against Hertha and a draw against Schalke in the league, Schmidt and Stöger were sacked on 3 December 2017. Stöger was still supported by the fans and the team at the time; he came to a fundraising event for disabled kids the night after his dismissal.

=== Borussia Dortmund ===
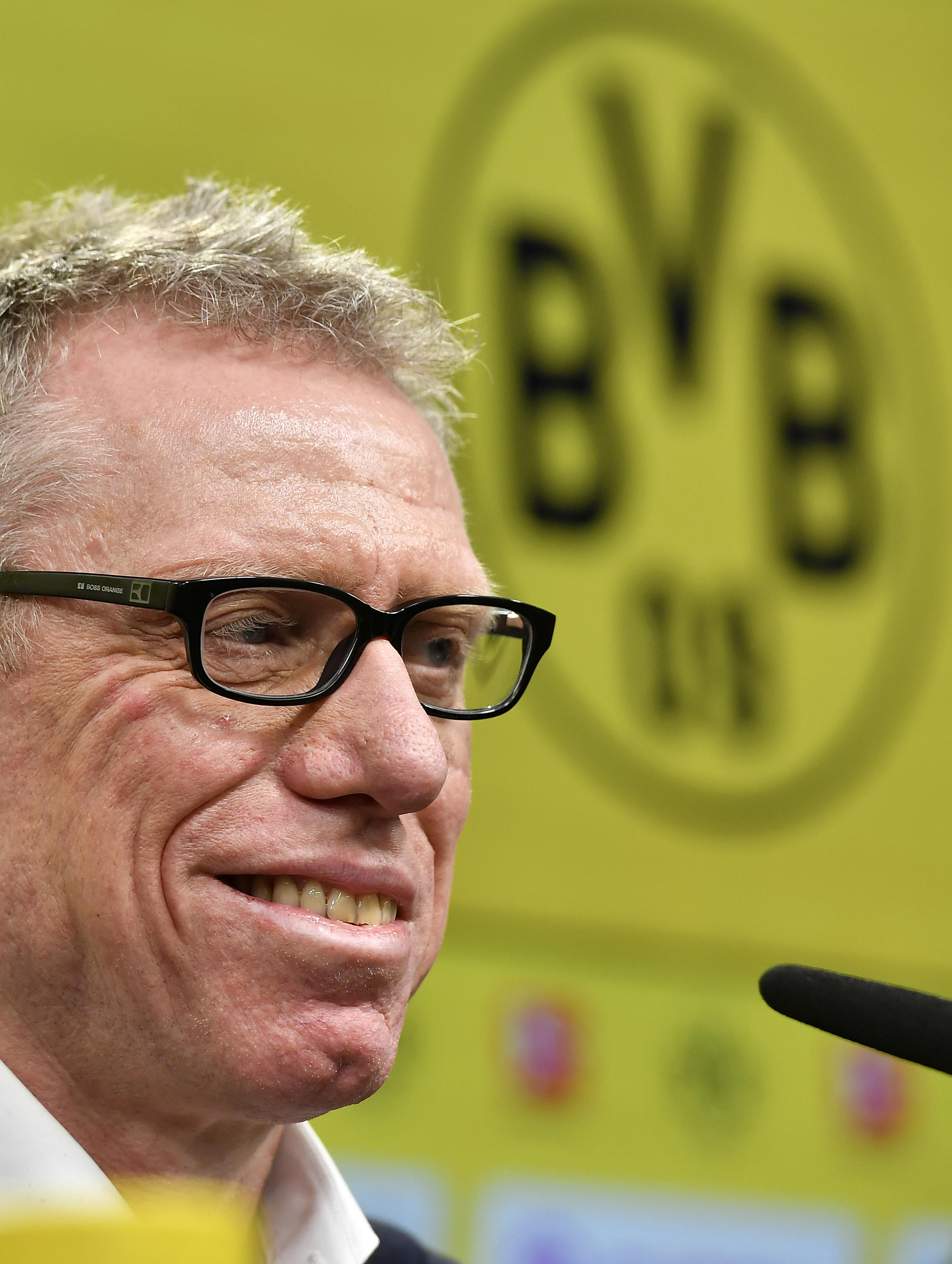
Stöger during his stint with Borussia Dortmund in 2017

On 10 December 2017, Stöger was appointed as successor to Peter Bosz to coach Borussia Dortmund until the end of the season. Some colleagues found taking on this challenge a couple of days after leaving Köln, a little hard. With BVB sitting eighth in the league table, Stöger stabilized the team, his squad including young players such as Manuel Akanji and Jadon Sancho, as well as Sergio Gómez. At the end of the season, BVB finished fourth, qualifying for the UEFA Champions League on the final matchday. He left Dortmund on 12 May 2018.

=== Return to Austria Wien ===
In July 2019, Stöger returned to Austria Wien, becoming their sporting director. On 31 July 2020, he was appointed as head coach of the club for a third stint. He left the club by the end of the 2020–21 season.

=== Move to Ferencváros ===
On 5 June 2021, Stöger signed as head coach for Hungarian side Ferencváros. Under his tenure, the team managed to get to the group stage of the UEFA Europa League, where they were drawn together with Bayer Leverkusen, Celtic and Real Betis. Ferencváros lost five of the six group stage games, finishing last in their group. After suffering its first away loss domestically to newly-promoted Debreceni, he was relieved of his duties by the club on 13 December 2021.

=== Rapid Wien ===
In May 2025, Stöger became the head coach of Rapid Wien, signing a contract until 2027. He was dismissed by Rapid on 28 November 2025 after a 1–4 Conference League loss to Raków Częstochowa.

== Career statistics ==
=== International ===
Appearances and goals by national team and year
National team	Year	Apps	Goals
Austria	1988	4	0
Austria	1989	3	0
Austria	1990	1	0
Austria	1991	8	0
Austria	1992	9	2
Austria	1993	7	0
Austria	1994	8	3
Austria	1995	4	4
Austria	1996	4	0
Austria	1997	8	4
Austria	1998	8	2
Austria	1999	1	0
Total		65	15

Scores and results list Austria's goal tally first, score column indicates score after each Stöger goal.

List of international goals scored by Peter Stöger
No.	Date	Venue	Opponent	Score	Result	Competition
1	19 August 1992	Tehelné pole, Bratislava	Czechoslovakia	1–0	2–2	Friendly
2	28 October 1992	Praterstadion, Vienna	Israel	4–1	5–2	1994 World Cup qualifier
3	17 May 1994	Stadion GKS, Katowice	Poland	1–0	4–3	Friendly
4	17 May 1994	Stadion GKS, Katowice	Poland	2–1	4–3	Friendly
5	17 May 1994	Stadion GKS, Katowice	Poland	3–2	4–3	Friendly
6	6 September 1995	Ernst-Happel-Stadion, Vienna	Republic of Ireland	1–0	3–1	Euro 1996 qualifier
7	6 September 1995	Ernst-Happel-Stadion, Vienna	Republic of Ireland	2–0	3–1	Euro 1996 qualifier
8	6 September 1995	Ernst-Happel-Stadion, Vienna	Republic of Ireland	3–1	3–1	Euro 1996 qualifier
9	11 October 1995	Ernst-Happel-Stadion, Vienna	Portugal	1–0	1–1	Euro 1996 qualifier
10	30 April 1997	Ernst-Happel-Stadion, Vienna	Estonia	2–0	2–0	1998 World Cup qualifier
11	8 June 1997	Daugava Stadium, Riga	Latvia	3–0	3–1	1998 World Cup qualifier
12	11 October 1997	Ernst-Happel-Stadion, Vienna	Belarus	2–0	4–0	1998 World Cup qualifier
13	11 October 1997	Ernst-Happel-Stadion, Vienna	Belarus	4–0	4–0	1998 World Cup qualifier
14	2 June 1998	Ernst-Happel-Stadion, Vienna	Liechtenstein	3–0	6–0	Friendly
15	2 June 1998	Ernst-Happel-Stadion, Vienna	Liechtenstein	4–0	6–0	Friendly

=== Managerial record ===
As of matches played on 27 November 2025

Team	From	To	Record					
Team	From	To	G	W	D	L	Win %	Ref.
Austria Wien	6 May 2005	12 December 2005	33	19	8	6	57.58	
First Vienna	14 October 2007	26 April 2010	79	38	13	28	48.10	
Grazer AK	26 November 2010	25 May 2011	15	9	5	1	60.00	
Wiener Neustadt	1 June 2011	30 May 2012	37	6	15	16	16.22	
Austria Wien	30 May 2012	11 June 2013	42	30	7	5	71.43	
1. FC Köln	11 June 2013	3 December 2017	168	60	54	54	35.71	
Borussia Dortmund	10 December 2017	12 May 2018	24	10	8	6	41.67	
Austria Wien	31 July 2020	5 June 2021	39	17	9	13	43.59	
Ferencváros	5 June 2021	13 December 2021	32	19	2	11	59.38	
Rapid Wien	2 June 2025	27 November 2025	27	13	5	9	48.15	
Total			494	218	126	150	44.13	—

== Honours ==
=== Player ===
Austria Wien

- Austrian Football Bundesliga: 1990–91, 1991–92, 1992–93
- Austrian Cup: 1989–90, 1991–92, 1993–94
- Austrian Supercup: 1990, 1991, 1992, 1993

Rapid Wien

- Austrian Football Bundesliga: 1995–96
- UEFA Cup Winners' Cup: Runner–up 1995–96
- Austrian Supercup: 1996

=== Manager ===
Austria Wien

- Austrian Cup: 2004–05
- Austrian Football Bundesliga: 2012–13

1. FC Köln

- 2. Liga : 2013–14
