= 1994–95 Austrian Cup =

Tournament details
- Country: Austria

Final positions
- Champions: Rapid Wien
- Runners-up: DSV Leoben

The 1994–95 Austrian Cup (German: ÖFB-Cup) was the 61st season of Austria's nationwide football cup competition. The final was held at the Ernst-Happel-Stadion, Vienna on 5 June 1995.

The competition was won by Rapid Wien after beating DSV Leoben 1–0.

== First round ==
Team 1	Score	Team 2
26 July 1994
SV Wals-Grünau	2–0	FC Zell am See
USK Anif	0–1	FC Salzburg
ÖTSU Henndorf	0–0 (a.e.t.) (0–2 p)	ASK Salzburg
4 August 1994
Friesacher AC	3–2	SV Lendorf
SK Treibach	1–4	Rapid Lienz
SVG Bleiburg	4–0	WSG Wietersdorf
Wolfsberger AC	2–1	Villacher SV
5 August 1994
SC Eisenstadt	1–0 (a.e.t.)	ASK Baumgarten
SV Mattersburg	1–3 (a.e.t.)	SV Rohrbach
6 August 1994
ASK Ybbs	2–0	Kremser SC
Badener AC	1–3	SV Oed/Zeillern
EPSV Gmünd	1–2	SV Langenrohr
FC Waidhofen/Ybbs	0–0 (a.e.t.) (6–5 p)	ASK-BSC Bruck/Leitha
FC ÖMV Stadlau	1–2	Gerasdorf/Wiener Sportclub
KDAG Phönix Wien	2–0	Wienerberg/Inzersdorf
Red Star Wien	0–8	Favoritner AC
SC Zwettl	2–2 (a.e.t.) (7–6 p)	ASV Hohenau
SC/ESV Parndorf 1919	1–0 (a.e.t.)	UFC Tadten
SV Essling	2–0	Slovan/HAC
SV St. Margarethen	1–0	UFC Purbach
7 August 1994
SR Donaufeld	1–0	Floridsdorfer AC
SV Laaerberg	0–3	1. Simmeringer SC
9 August 1994
Schwarz-Weiß Bregenz	1–0	FC Lustenau 07
VfB Hohenems	5–2	SC Rheindorf Altach
10 August 1994
FC Hard	6–2	Rot-Weiß Rankweil
13 August 1994
SV Grieskirchen	1–0	Austria Tabak Linz
Union Rohrbach/Berg	0–2	Eintracht Wels
15 August 1994
FC Deutschkreutz	1–0 (a.e.t.)	ASK Klingenbach
SC Marchtrenk	3–0	ATSV Lenzing
SV Traun	9–1	SV Bad Ischl
SV Wörgl	7–1	SV Hall
Wacker Innsbruck Amateure	1–4	ESV Saalfelden
16 August 1994
ASV Vösendorf	0–6	VSE St. Pölten
ATSV Sattledt	1–2 (a.e.t.)	Wiener Sportclub/Gerasdorf
Donau Linz	1–2	Union St. Florian
LUV Graz	1–1 (a.e.t.) (3–5 p)	SV Gratkorn
SAK Klagenfurt	1–1 (a.e.t.) (5–6 p)	Austria Tabak Linz
SC Bruck/Mur	0–1	DSV Leoben
SC Himberg	1–2	SV Stockerau
'SC Kundl	5–0	Innsbrucker SK
SK Schärding	0–1	SV Braunau
SPG Rum	1–1 (a.e.t.) (3–0 p)	SC Austria Lustenau
SV Alpine Kindberg	0–6	Grazer AK
SV Feldbach	1–2	Kapfenberger SV
SV Feldkirchen	0–2	SV Spittal/Drau
SV Horn	1–3 (a.e.t.)	1. SC Wiener Neustadt
SC Fürstenfeld	0–1	Grazer AK
SV Leibnitz	2–0	ASK Köflach
SV Rottenmann	0–6	ASK Voitsberg
SV Schwechat	4–2 (a.e.t.)	First Vienna FC
SV Sigleß	1–2 (a.e.t.)	SV Oberwart
TSV Hartberg	5–0	SC Fürstenfeld
WSG Wattens	2–1	FC Kufstein
WSK Kaprun	0–4	FC Puch
17 August 1994
SK Altheim	0–1 (a.e.t.)	SV Ried

== Second round ==
Team 1	Score	Team 2
6 September 1994
WSG Wattens	0–4	SC Kundl
Wacker Innsbruck Amateure	0–3	FC Puch
7 September 1994
SV Wörgl	6–1	SPG Rum
9 September 1994
Kapfenberger SV	0–1	SV Braunau+
Rapid Lienz	0–2	SV Ried
SV Schwechat	1–3	Favoritner AC
TSV Hartberg	4–1	Friesacher AC
10 September 1994
1. Simmeringer SC	1–3	Wiener Sportclub/Gerasdorf
ASK Salzburg	0–7	FC Hard
ASK Ybbs	0–3	VSE St. Pölten
FC Deutschkreutz	3–2	VfB Mödling
SV Gratkorn	3–3 (a.e.t.) (2–3 p)	Linzer ASK
FC Waidhofen/Ybbs	0–2	Gerasdorf/Wiener Sport-Club
SC Marchtrenk	2–6	Grazer AK
SC Zwettl	1–2	SV Stockerau
SC/ESV Parndorf 1919	10–0	KDAG Phönix Wien
SR Donaufeld	2–1	SC Eisenstadt
SV Essling	0–5	FK Austria Wien
SV Grieskirchen	4–4 (a.e.t.) (7–6 p)	SV Flavia Solva
SV Wals-Grünau	1–6	FC Tirol
SV Langenrohr	3–7	Admira/Wacker
SV Leibnitz	1–3	SK Vorwärts Steyr
SV Oed/Zeillern	0–6	SK Rapid Wien
SV St. Margarethen	1–3	1. SC Wiener Neustadt
SV Traun	0–9	FC Linz
SVG Bleiburg	2–3	ASK Voitsberg
Union St. Florian	1–4	DSV Leoben
VfB Hohenems	0–2	SV Austria Salzburg
Wolfsberger AC	0–2	SV Spittal/Drau
11 September 1994
Eintracht Wels	3–2	SK Sturm Graz
Schwarz-Weiß Bregenz	2–4	FC Salzburg
12 September 1994
SV Rohrbach	1–1 (a.e.t.) (6–5 p)	SV Oberwart

== Third round ==
Team 1	Score	Team 2
25 October 1994
Gerasdorf/Wiener Sport-Club	0–3	DSV Leoben
SV Rohrbach	1–1 (a.e.t.) (3–4 p)	VSE St. Pölten
TSV Hartberg	3–2 (a.e.t.)	1. SC Wiener Neustadt
26 October 1994
ASK Voitsberg	3–3 (a.e.t.) (2–4 p)	SV Spittal/Drau
Eintracht Wels	0–1 (a.e.t.)	SV Braunau
FC Deutschkreutz	0–4	SK Rapid Wien
FC Salzburg	1–4	SV Ried
Favoritner AC	1–0	Admira/Wacker
FC Hard	0–4	Linzer ASK
SC Kundl	3–1	FC Puch
SC/ESV Parndorf 1919	0–3	SK Vorwärts Steyr
SR Donaufeld	0–5	SV Stockerau
SV Austria Salzburg	3–2	FC Tirol
SV Grieskirchen	0–4	Grazer AK
SV Wörgl	1–0	FC Linz
Wiener Sportclub/Gerasdorf	0–4	FK Austria Wien

== Fourth round ==
Team 1	Score	Team 2
14 April 1995
TSV Hartberg	0–0 (a.e.t.) (5–4 p)	SK Vorwärts Steyr
15 April 1995
Favoritner AC	1–0	SV Ried
SC Kundl	0–2 (a.e.t.)	FK Austria Wien
SV Braunau	1–3	Grazer AK
SV Spittal/Drau	3–3 (a.e.t.) (5–4 p)	Linzer ASK
SV Stockerau	0–1	DSV Leoben
VSE St. Pölten	0–2	SV Austria Salzburg
16 April 1995
SV Wörgl	2–3	SK Rapid Wien

== Quarter-finals ==
Team 1	Score	Team 2
2 May 1995
DSV Leoben	2–1	FK Austria Wien
Grazer AK	0–0 (a.e.t.) (4–5 p)	SK Rapid Wien
SV Spittal/Drau	0–2	SV Austria Salzburg
TSV Hartberg	1–0	Favoritner AC

== Semi-finals ==
Team 1	Score	Team 2
16 May 1995
SK Rapid Wien	2–0	SV Austria Salzburg
TSV Hartberg	0–1	DSV Leoben

== Final ==
5 June 1995
15:30

SK Rapid Wien	1–0	DSV Leoben
Guggi 20'	Report

Ernst-Happel-Stadion, Vienna
Attendance: 15,000
Referee: Karl Finzinger
