= Roman Pivarník =

Slovak footballer (born 1967)

Personal information
- Date of birth: 17 February 1967 (age 59)
- Place of birth: Košice, Czechoslovakia
- Height: 1.76 m (5 ft 9 in)
- Position: Midfielder

Team information
- Current team: 1. FC Tatran Prešov (manager)

Youth career
- ZŤS Košice

Senior career*
Years	Team	Apps	(Gls)
1987–1988	FK Dukla Banská Bystrica	4	(0)
1988–1992	FK Dukla Prague	74	(1)
1992–1994	SK Sigma Olomouc	45	(2)
1994–1997	Rapid Wien	59	(5)
1997–1998	SV Gerasdorf		
1998–1999	Bnei Yehuda		
1999–2000	Carl Zeiss Jena		

Managerial career
- 2000–2002: 1. HFK Olomouc
- 2002–2003: FC Vysočina Jihlava
- 2003–2004: Al-Qadisiyah FC
- 2005: SK HS Kroměříž
- 2006: Rapid Wien (assistant manager)
- 2007–2010: 1. FC Tatran Prešov
- 2011–2012: FC Vysočina Jihlava
- 2012–2013: SK Sigma Olomouc
- 2014–2016: Bohemians 1905
- 2016–2017: FC Viktoria Plzeň
- 2017–2018: FC Zbrojovka Brno
- 2019: FC Fastav Zlín
- 2021–2022: Al Tadhamon SC
- 2026-: 1. FC Tatran Prešov
- * Club domestic league appearances and goals

Roman Pivarník (born 17 February 1967) is a Slovak football manager and former player. Pivarník's playing career included a stint at SK Sigma Olomouc, which included matches in the inaugural season of the Czech First League. He played 17 matches and scored twice over the course of the season.

== Coaching career ==
Pivarník signed a two-year deal to take over at Czech First League club Olomouc in the summer of 2012. He oversaw the club's victory in the Czech Supercup in 2012 but id not last for the whole season, as he was replaced by assistant manager Martin Kotůlek following a poor run of results in May 2013, with the club lying in fourth place in the league.

== Honours ==
=== Player ===
Dukla Prague

- Czechoslovak Cup: 1989–90

Rapid Wien

- Austrian Football Bundesliga: 1995–96
- Austrian Cup: 1995
- UEFA Cup Winners' Cup runner-Up: 1995–96

=== Manager ===
Tatran Prešov

- Slovak Second Liga: 2007–08

Sigma Olomouc

- Czech Supercup: 2012
