= Christian Stumpf =

Austrian footballer

Personal information
- Date of birth: 24 December 1966 (age 59)
- Place of birth: Linz, Austria
- Height: 1.87 m (6 ft 2 in)
- Position: Forward

Youth career
- Union Linz

Senior career*
Years	Team	Apps	(Gls)
1986–1989	SK VOEST Linz		
1989–1990	SV Leibnitz Flavia Solva		
1990–1995	FC Linz	139	(54)
1995–1998	Rapid Wien	78	(28)
1998–1999	Karlsruher SC	9	(1)
1999–2000	LASK	36	(7)
2000–2001	ASKÖ Pasching	24	(6)
2001–2002	LASK	29	(17)
2002–2003	Wiener Sportklub	24	(14)
2003–2004	Austria Lustenau	33	(16)

International career
1995–1996	Austria	2	(1)

Managerial career
- 2006–2008: LASK Linz (assistant)
- 2009–2018: Union Edelweiß Linz
- * Club domestic league appearances and goals

Christian Stumpf (born 24 December 1966, in Linz) is an Austrian former professional footballer who played as a forward. He made two appearances for the Austria national team, scoring once.

== Career statistics ==
Scores and results list Austria's goal tally first.

No	Date	Venue	Opponent	Score	Result	Competition
1.	15 November 1995	Windsor Park, Belfast, Northern Ireland	Northern Ireland	2–4	3–5	Euro 1996 qualifier

== Honours ==
- Austrian Football Bundesliga winner: 1997.
- UEFA Cup Winners' Cup finalist: 1996.
