= Sascha Bürringer =

Austrian footballer

Personal information
- Date of birth: 3 September 1975 (age 51)
- Position: Midfielder

Senior career*
Years	Team	Apps	(Gls)
1993–1996	Rapid Wien	14	(0)
1996–1997	Wiener Sport-Club		
- * Club domestic league appearances and goals

Sascha Bürringer (born 3 September 1975) is an Austrian former footballer.
