= Vorwärts Stadium =

Multipurpose stadium in Steyr, Austria

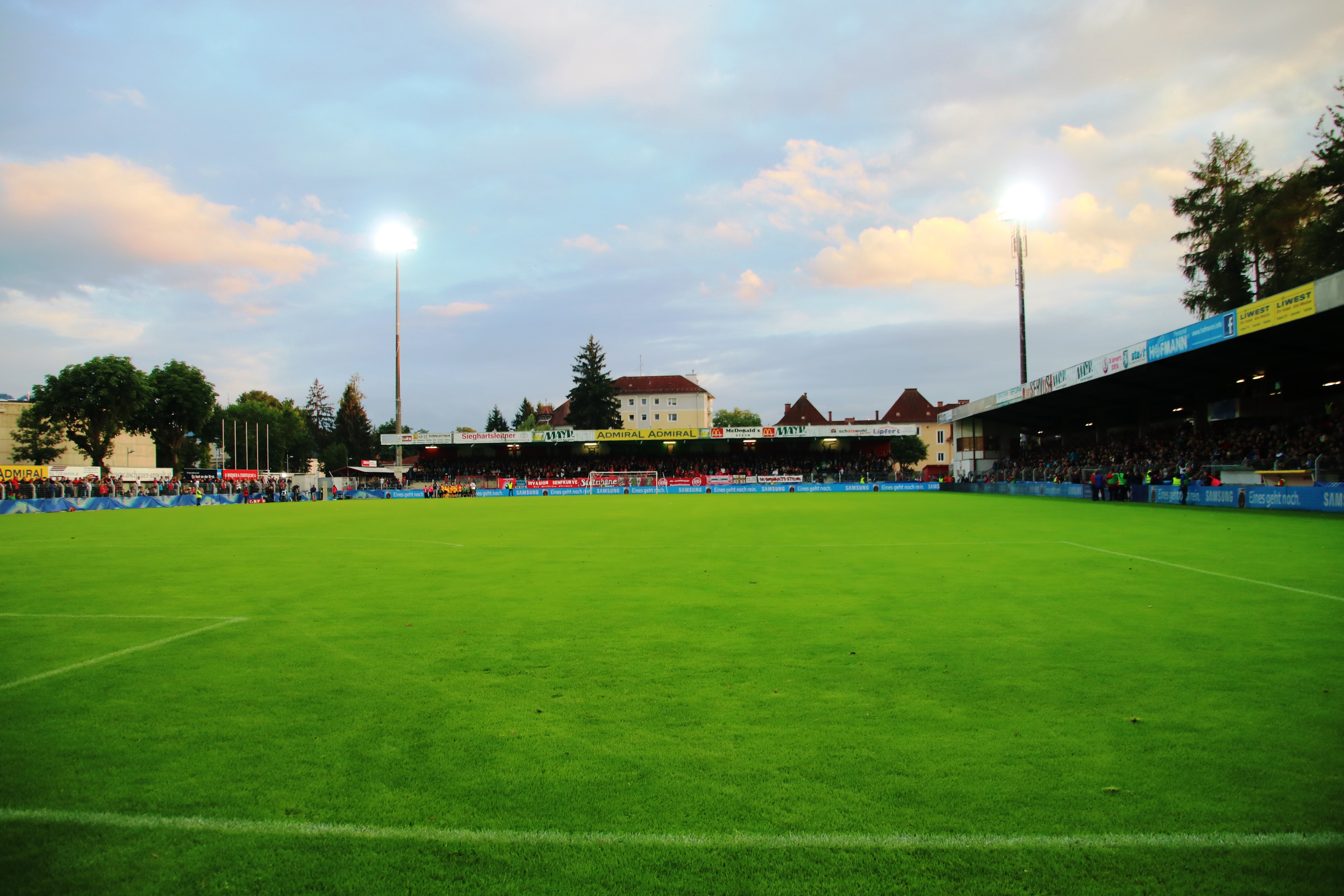
- Interactive map of Vorwärts Stadium
- Location: Volksstraße, Steyr, Austria
- Coordinates: 48°2′15.51″N 14°24′38.83″E
- Capacity: 6,000

Construction
- Opened: 1986; 40 years ago

Tenants
- SK Vorwärts Steyr

Vorwärts Stadium, also known as the LIWEST Arena, is a multi-purpose stadium in Steyr, Austria. It is used mostly for football matches and is the home ground of SK Vorwärts Steyr. The stadium holds 6,000 people and was built in 1986.
