= Peter Guggi =

Austrian footballer

Personal information
- Date of birth: 25 September 1967 (age 59)
- Place of birth: Graz, Austria
- Height: 1.78 m (5 ft 10 in)
- Position: Midfielder

Youth career
- Grazer AK

Senior career*
Years	Team	Apps	(Gls)
- Grazer AK
1989–1990	DSV Leoben		
1991	→ LASK Linz (loan)		
1991–1992	Grazer AK		
1992–1994	Wiener Sportklub		
1994	Admira Wacker		
1994–1997	Rapid Wien	71	(5)
1997–1998	Admira Wacker		
1998–1999	Hibernian	8	(2)
1999–2003	DSV Leoben		
- * Club domestic league appearances and goals

Peter Guggi (born 25 September 1967) is an Austrian former professional footballer who played as a midfielder. He played for Rapid Wien in the 1996 UEFA Cup Winners' Cup Final.
