= Stephan Marasek =

Austrian footballer and manager

Personal information
- Date of birth: 4 January 1970 (age 56)
- Place of birth: Mödling, Austria
- Height: 1.80 m (5 ft 11 in)
- Position: Midfielder

Senior career*
Years	Team	Apps	(Gls)
1987–1993	Admira Wacker	20	(0)
1993–1996	Rapid Wien	99	(5)
1996–1997	SC Freiburg	8	(0)
1997–2002	Swarovski Tirol	135	(4)
2002–2003	Austria Salzburg	11	(0)
Total		273	(9)

International career
	Austria	11	(1)

Managerial career
- 2008–2009: SV Oberperfuss
- 2009–2010: SVG Reichenau
- * Club domestic league appearances and goals

Stephan Marasek (born 4 January 1970) is an Austrian former professional football player and manager who last managed SVG Reichenau.

== Honours ==
- Austrian Bundesliga: 1995–96
- Austrian Cup: 1994–95
- UEFA Cup Winners' Cup finalist: 1995–96
