= Patrick Jovanovic =

Austrian footballer

Personal information
- Birth name: Prvoslav Jovanovic
- Date of birth: 17 December 1973 (age 52)
- Place of birth: Wien, Austria
- Height: 1.83 m (6 ft 0 in)
- Position: Defender

Team information
- Current team: Rapid Wien II (assistant manager)

Youth career
- Rapid Wien

Senior career*
Years	Team	Apps	(Gls)
1990–1998	Rapid Wien	121	(1)
1990–1991	→ Favoritner AC (loan)		
1998–2000	Austria Lustenau	56	(1)
2000–2004	FC Kärnten	81	(1)
2004–2005	SC-ESV Parndorf	25	(1)
2005–2006	Kremser SC	26	(0)
2006–2007	SV Horn	11	(0)
2007–2009	ASV Vösendorf	56	(3)
2009–2010	SC Wiener Viktoria	15	(1)
2010–2011	SC Au am Leithaberge	16	(1)
2011–2014	SC Kirchberg/Pielach	68	(8)

International career
1991	Austria U18	3	(0)
1992–1995	Austria U21	20	(0)

Managerial career
- 2010–2011: SC Au am Leithaberge (player-manager)
- 2011–2014: SC Kirchberg/Pielach (player-manager)
- 2015–2021: Rapid Wien II (assistant)
- 2021–2022: Rapid Wien II
- 2022–: Rapid Wien II (assistant)
- * Club domestic league appearances and goals

Patrick Jovanovic (born 17 December 1973 as Prvoslav Jovanovic) is an Austrian football manager and former player who played as a defender. He is an assistant manager of SK Rapid Wien II.
