= Michael Konsel =

Austrian footballer (born 1962)

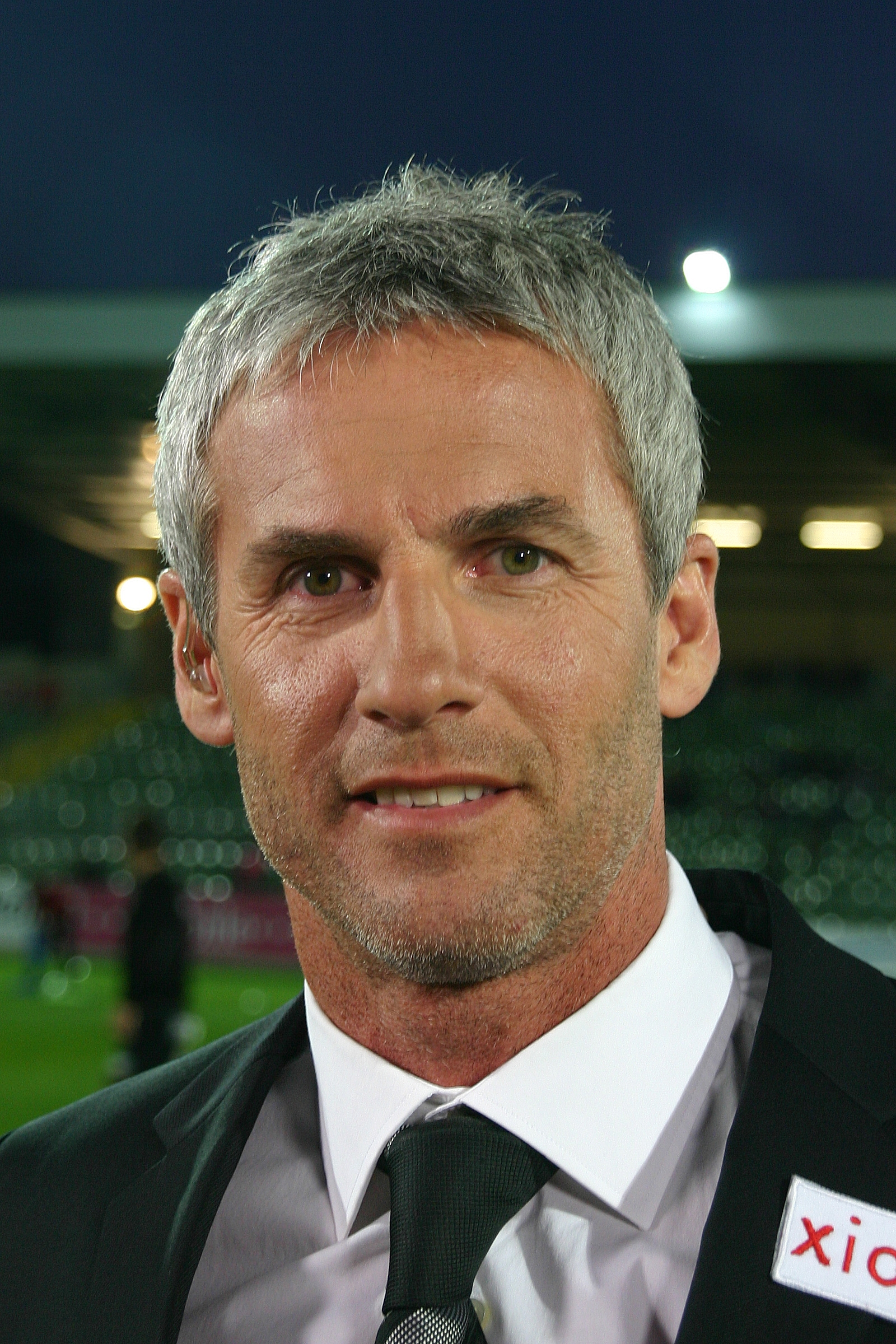
- Konsel in 2009

Personal information
- Date of birth: 6 March 1962 (age 64)
- Place of birth: Vienna, Austria
- Height: 1.85 m (6 ft 1 in)
- Position: Goalkeeper

Youth career
- 1968–1978: Fortuna 05
- 1978–1982: Kritzendorf

Senior career*
Years	Team	Apps	(Gls)
1982–1984	First Vienna	13	(0)
1984–1997	Rapid Wien	395	(0)
1997–1999	Roma	40	(0)
1999–2000	Venezia	15	(0)
Total		463	(0)

International career
1985–1998	Austria	43	(0)
- * Club domestic league appearances and goals

Michael Konsel (born 6 March 1962) is an Austrian former professional footballer who played as a goalkeeper.

== Club career ==
Born in Vienna, Konsel started his professional career with First Vienna and moved to local rivals Rapid Wien in 1985. He then played a part in the successful Rapid team in the 1980s, claiming the League crown twice and most prominently losing the UEFA Cup Winners Cup final 3–1 against Everton in Rotterdam in 1985. He stayed at Rapid for 12 years and captained the side in his last two seasons. In 1996, he played in the UEFA Cup Winners Cup Final for a second time, this time against Paris Saint-Germain in Brussels, which Rapid lost again, this time by a score of 1–0.

In 1997, at 35 years of age, Konsel moved abroad to join Italian side AS Roma in Serie A under manager Zdeněk Zeman; although he was initially not well-known in Italy, his impressive performances led him to be voted the best goalkeeper and best foreign footballer of the season in his first year with the club. After an injury-plagued second season in Rome he finished his career at Venezia, where he remained for a season.

In 1996, he was chosen Austrian Footballer of the Year. He was voted in Rapid's Team of the Century in 1999.

== International career ==
Konsel made his debut for Austria in an October 1985 friendly match against Yugoslavia, and was a participant at the 1990 and 1998 FIFA World Cup, serving as a back-up to Klaus Lindenberger in the former edition of the tournament, and first-choice in the latter. He earned 43 caps at international level in total (no goals scored). His international farewell match was an August 1998 friendly against France, in which game he was substituted by his eternal rival for Austria's first goalkeeper jersey, Franz Wohlfahrt.

== Style of play ==
Konsel was considered consistent and efficient goalkeeper, known for his shot-stopping ability and longevity throughout his career. Nicknamed "The Panther," he was known for his ability with the ball at his feet, having played both as midfielder and defender in his youth. He was also noted for speed and adeptness when coming off his line to collect crosses or when rushing out to anticipate opponents. He often functioned as a sweeper-keeper throughout his career, in particular in teams which relied on a high defensive line, the offside-trap, and zonal marking systems. One of his main influences as a goalkeeper was Dino Zoff.

== Media appearances ==
Konsel participated in the third season of the Austrian television dance competition Dancing Stars in 2007, coming in seventh place.

== Honours ==
Rapid Wien

- Austrian Bundesliga: 1986–87, 1987–88, 1995–96
- Austrian Cup: 1984–85, 1986–87, 1994–95
- Austrian Supercup: 1986, 1987, 1988

Individual

- Best Young Player of the Austrian Bundesliga: 1985
- Austrian Footballer of the Year: 1987, 1995, 1996
- Austrian Bundesliga Best Goalkeeper of the Year: 1987–88, 1994–95, 1995–96, 1996–97
- Rapid Wien's Team of the Century: 1999
