= Sergei Mandreko =

Russian footballer (1971–2022)

- Mandreko with VfL Bochum

Personal information
- Full name: Sergei Vladimirovich Mandreko
- Date of birth: 1 August 1971
- Place of birth: Kurgan-Tyube (now Bokhtar), Tajik SSR, USSR
- Date of death: 8 March 2022 (aged 50)
- Place of death: Austria
- Height: 1.75 m (5 ft 9 in)
- Position: Midfielder

Senior career*
Years	Team	Apps	(Gls)
1989	Vakhsh Kourgan‑Tyube	29	(7)
1990–1992	Pamir Dushanbe	38	(2)
1992–1997	Rapid Wien	107	(16)
1997–2000	Hertha BSC	37	(1)
2000–2003	VfL Bochum	56	(0)
2003–2005	SV Mattersburg	47	(1)
2005	SC-ESV Parndorf	11	(0)

International career
1991	USSR U-20	5	(1)
1992	CIS	4	(0)
1992	Tajikistan	1	(0)
1992–1994	Russia U-21	5	(0)
1994	Russia	1	(0)

Managerial career
- 2008–2009: Lokomotiv Moscow (assistant manager)
- 2015–2017: LAC-Inter (manager)
- * Club domestic league appearances and goals

Sergei Vladimirovich Mandreko (Russian: Серге́й Владимирович Мандреко; 1 August 1971 – 8 March 2022) was a Russian-Tajik football coach and player who played as a midfielder.

== Club career ==
Mandreko was born in Kurgan-Tyube, Tajik SSR. After leaving the newly independent Tajikistan after the dissolution of the Soviet Union he spent the rest of his club career in Austria and Germany.

== International career ==
Mandreko was capped at senior level by CIS, Russia and Tajikistan. With the Soviet Union national under-20 team Mandreko won the bronze medal at the FIFA World Youth Championship in 1991.

== Coaching career ==
From 2008 until 2009 Mandreko worked as an assistant manager under Rashid Rakhimov during his time with FC Lokomotiv Moscow.

== Personal life ==
Having suffered from amyotrophic lateral sclerosis since 2016, Mandreko died on 8 March 2022, at the age of 50.
