= Zoran Barisic =

Austrian footballer and manager (born 1970)

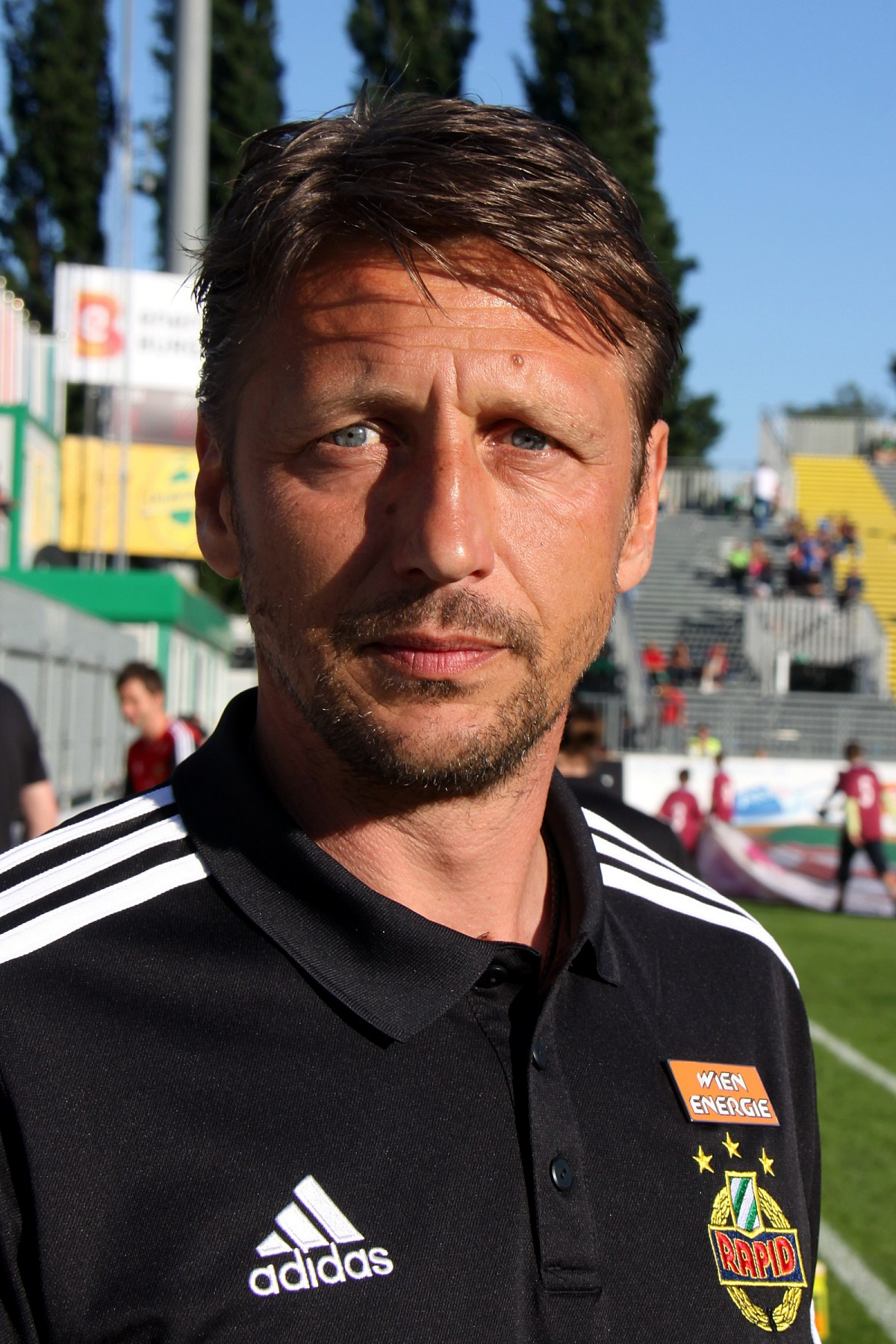
- Barisic in 2013

Personal information
- Date of birth: 22 May 1970 (age 56)
- Place of birth: Vienna, Austria
- Position: Midfielder

Senior career*
Years	Team	Apps	(Gls)
1989–1991	Wiener Sportklub	55	(4)
1991–1992	Favoritner AC	35	(8)
1992–1993	FC Admira/Wacker	35	(6)
1993–1995	Rapid Wien	83	(11)
1996–1997	FC Linz	13	(0)
1997–2002	Tirol Innsbruck	99	(13)
2002–2004	VfB Admira Wacker Mödling	19	(0)
2004–2005	SC Eisenstadt	26	(5)
Total		365	(47)

International career
1999	Austria	1	(0)

Managerial career
- 2011: Rapid Wien (caretaker)
- 2011–2013: Rapid Wien II
- 2013–2016: Rapid Wien
- 2017: Karabükspor
- 2018: Olimpija Ljubljana
- 2022–2023: Rapid Wien
- * Club domestic league appearances and goals

Zoran Barisic (Croatian: Barišić; born 22 May 1970) is an Austrian football manager and a former player.

== International career ==
Born in Austria, Barisic is of Croatian descent. He made one appearance for the Austria national team on 6 June 1999, a 5–0 loss to Israel. Barisic was disappointed with the professionalism of his manager Otto Barić, and decided not to be called up again.

== Managerial statistics ==
As of 11 November 2023

Managerial record by team and tenure
Team	Nat	From	To	Record								Ref
Team	Nat	From	To	G	W	D	L	GF	GA	GD	Win %	Ref
Rapid Wien (caretaker)	(Austria)	11 April 2011	30 May 2011	10	4	2	4	15	12	+3	40.00	
Rapid Wien II	(Austria)	30 May 2011	17 April 2013	55	29	13	13	103	60	+43	52.73	
Rapid Wien	(Austria)	17 April 2013	6 June 2016	148	74	37	37	260	174	+86	50.00	
Karabükspor	(Turkey)	17 February 2017	5 June 2017	13	4	4	5	14	19	−5	30.77	
Olimpija Ljubljana	(Slovenia)	4 September 2018	12 December 2018	15	9	5	1	36	22	+14	60.00	
Rapid Wien	(Austria)	16 October 2022	15 November 2023	46	20	11	15	95	61	+34	43.48	
Total				287	140	72	75	523	348	+175	48.78	—

== Honours ==
=== Player ===
Rapid Wien

- Austrian Bundesliga: 1995–96
- Austrian Cup: 1994–95

Tirol Innsbruck

- Austrian Bundesliga: 1999–2000, 2000–01, 2001–02
