= SK Vorwärts Steyr =

Association football club in Austria

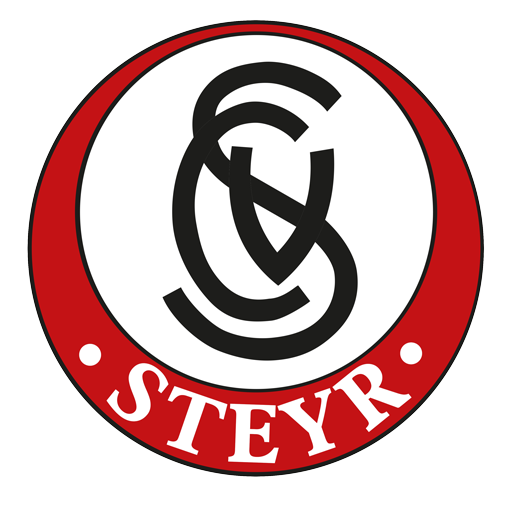
- Full name: Sportklub Vorwärts Steyr
- Founded: 1919; 107 years ago
- Ground: Vorwärts Stadium
- Capacity: 5,800
- Chairman: Markus Knasmüller
- Manager: Roko Mišlov
- League: Regionalliga Nord
- 2025–26: OÖ Liga, 2nd of 16 (promoted)
Home colours	Away colours	Third colours

SK Vorwärts Steyr is an Austrian association football club based in Steyr. It was founded in 1919. They play at the Vorwärts Stadium. Currently the club has about 500 members. Is one of the oldest football clubs in Upper Austria. In 1999 the club went bankrupt and reformed in lower leagues later in 2001. In 2011 Vorwärts was promoted to the Regional League (Middle) which is part of the third division of Austrian league football. In 2018 they were promoted to the Austrian Second League.

== History ==
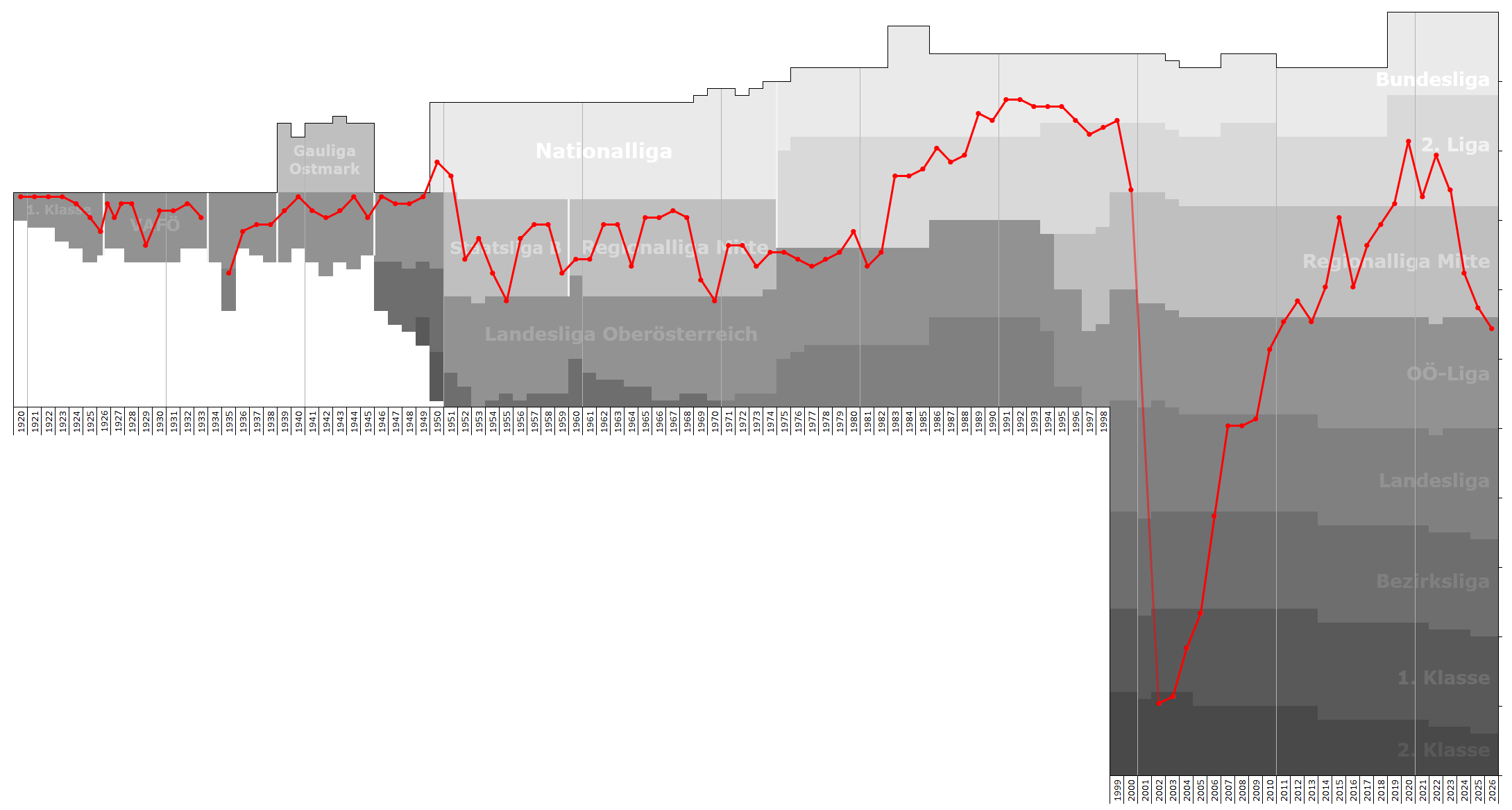
Historical chart of SK Vorwärts league performance

The club was founded as Steyrer Fußballklub Vorwärts with the club colours of red and white, the official founding ceremony was held at the Casino Steyr on 14 April 1919. The first match of Vorwärts Steyr was on 15 June 1919 in Linz against Linzer ASK (result 2–2). Already in its first year, the club won the Upper Austrian League; a national league did not exist at that time. In 1949 after dominating the state leagues, they managed to get to the Austrian Cup final which was held in Vienna against Austria Vienna which they lost 2–5, however reaching the final is still considered a major success even to this day. In the 1960s and 1970s, the club spent all its time in the Regionalliga Mitte or the Upper Austrian League. This twenty-year dry spell ended in 1979, when they returned to the Second Division. From 1982 Vorwärts established themselves in the second division until in 1988, after 37 years, when they gained promotion to the highest Austrian league, the Bundesliga where the club remained until 1996. The early-1990s saw the club reach its best ever league position in the 1990–91 and 1991–92 seasons, seventh place in the table. In 1995 they played in the Intertoto Cup and won the group stage remaining unbeaten (2–1 away win against Eintracht Frankfurt) and missed out on the UEFA Cup qualifiers only after an away defeat to Racing Strasbourg. By 1995 the club was deeply in debt with about 15 million shillings owed, so they required a bailout in the form of a guarantee from the town of Steyr. The bitter 0–2 defeat against LASK Linz on 29 May 1999 sealed the relegation from the top flight. Finally, the club had their license permanently withdrawn on 11 January 2000, ceasing operations and forfeiting the remaining matches. With an application for compulsory settlement, bankruptcy proceedings were opened. The club restarted from the lowest amateur division in August 2001. Since then the club has steadily risen through the amateur leagues and in 2018 returned to the 2nd tier of Austrian football.

== Seasons ==
Season	Division (Tier)	Position	W	L	D	+/-	Pts.
2001–02	2. Klasse Ost (VIII)	2	15	5	2	+53	50
2002–03	2. Klasse Ost (VIII)	1	16	4	2	+47	52
2003–04	1. Klasse Ost (VII)	6	8	5	9	+3	29
2004–05	1. Klasse Ost (VII)	1	21	4	1	+66	67
2005–06	Bezirksliga Ost (VI)	1	17	6	3	+46	57
2006–07	2. Landesliga Ost (V)	2	17	4	5	+34	55
2007–08	2. Landesliga Ost (V)	2	14	8	4	+25	50
2008–09	2. Landesliga Ost (V)	1	16	6	4	+25	54
2009–10	OÖ Liga (IV)	5	12	6	8	+16	42
2010–11	OÖ Liga (IV)	1	15	10	1	+35	55
2011–12	Regionalliga Mitte (III)	14	6	9	15	−22	27
2012–13	OÖ Liga (IV)	1	17	2	6	+17	53
2013–14	Regionalliga Mitte	12	11	4	15	−10	37
2014–15	Regionalliga Mitte	2	18	5	7	+16	59
2015–16	Regionalliga Mitte	12	9	7	14	−13	34
2016–17	Regionalliga Mitte	6	12	8	10	+7	44
2017–18	Regionalliga Mitte	3	17	4	9	+32	55
2018–19	2. Liga (II)	14	5	6	19	−36	21
2019–20	2. Liga	7	11	8	11	+6	41
2020–21	2. Liga	15	7	9	14	−25	30
2021–22	2. Liga	10	10	7	13	−13	37
2022–23	2. Liga	14	8	8	14	−18	32
2023–24	Regionalliga Mitte (III)	10	10	8	12	−6	38
2024–25	Regionalliga Mitte	15	6	6	18	−25	24
2025–26	OÖ Liga (IV)	2	18	5	7	+30	59
Green: Promotion | Red: Relegation

== Honours ==
=== Before the bankruptcy ===
- 1 Austrian Cup Finalist: 1949
- 13 Upper Austrian Champions
- 2 Upper Austrian Cup Winners
- 12 Bundesliga seasons: 1950–1951, 1988–1996, 1999

=== Since the reformation ===
- 2. Liga Ost OÖ Winners: 2003
- 1. Liga Ost OÖ Winners: 2005
- Bezirksliga Ost OÖ Winners: 2006
- OÖ Landespokalsieger Winners: 2009
- Upper Austrian Cup Winners: 2010, 2013
- Fourth Division Champions: 2011, 2013

== Fans ==
The club has seen a sharp decline in attendances since the bankruptcy however the team is still often accompanied by many fans even at away games; in big games the away following frequently exceeds more than 1000 'red-whites'. The largest fan club, Südchaos-Steyr, was founded in 2009 and is considered to be an ultras group, and they usually occupy the South stand of the stadium. They publish a fanzine called Bengalen, Bier und Bosna.

== Current squad ==
As of 26 January 2026

Note: Flags indicate national team as defined under FIFA eligibility rules; some limited exceptions apply. Players may hold more than one non-FIFA nationality.

No.	Pos.	Nation	Player
1	GK	AUT	Bernhard Staudinger
4	DF	AUT	Stefan Goldnagl
5	MF	SRB	Aleksa Markovic
6	MF	ESP	Pol Salvador
7	MF	AUT	Manuel Ramskogler
8	MF	AUT	Christian Laskaj
9	FW	CZE	Milan Jurdík
10	FW	AUT	Alexander Weinstabl
12	GK	AUT	Paolo Gmeiner
13	DF	AUT	Patrik Lovrinovic
17	DF	AUT	Bilal Telbiz
18	MF	CRO	Roko Mišlov

No.	Pos.	Nation	Player
19	FW	AUT	Kenan Karahodzic
20	DF	IRQ	Kaith Ali Almadfai
21	MF	AUT	Tolga Demir
22	MF	GER	Pepe Brekner
24	FW	AUT	Oliver Filip
26	MF	AUT	Alparslan Baran
27	MF	AUT	Markus Wallner
29	FW	AUT	Robin Mayrhofer
33	DF	AUT	Aleksandar Maric
41	MF	CRO	Davor Brajkovic
77	DF	AUT	Michael Martic
78	MF	SVN	Amir Pasic

=== Out on loan ===
Note: Flags indicate national team as defined under FIFA eligibility rules; some limited exceptions apply. Players may hold more than one non-FIFA nationality.

No. / Pos. / Nation / Player	No. / Pos. / Nation / Player
