= 1981–82 Austrian Cup =

Tournament details
- Country: Austria

Final positions
- Champions: Austria Wien
- Runners-up: SSW Innsbruck

The 1981–82 Austrian Cup (German: ÖFB-Cup) was the 48th season of Austria's nationwide football cup competition. The final was played over two legs, on 20 April 1982 at the Tivoli, Innsbruck and on 12 May 1982 at the Franz Horr Stadium, Vienna.

The competition was won by Austria Wien after beating SSW Innsbruck 4–1 on aggregate.

== First round ==
Team 1	Score	Team 2
6 August 1981
IG Dornbirn/Bregenz	0–1	IG Bregenz/Dornbirn
7 August 1981
Badener AC	1–3 (a.e.t.)	1. Wiener Neustädter SC
Kremser SC	1–2	Favoritner AC
SV Schwechat	3–2 (a.e.t.)	SV Heid Stockerau
8 August 1981
Wolfsberger AC	0–2	SV Spittal/Drau
SC Austria Lustenau	0–2	SPG Innsbruck
1. Simmeringer SC	2–0	SC Neusiedl am See
ASK Voitsberg	1–0	Donawitzer SV Alpine
Chemie Linz	2–0	SC Amateure St. Veit/Glan
Kapfenberger SV	2–1	SV Flavia Solva
SV Rapid Lienz	0–1	Union Wels
SC Kundl	1–3	Admira Dornbirn
FC Zell am See	0–3	SC Tamsweg
SR Donaufeld	0–6	SC Eisenstadt
SV Feldkirchen	0–0 (a.e.t.) (4–3 p)	SK Austria Klagenfurt
SV Gmunden	3–4	SV St. Veit
SV Mattersburg	0–4	First Vienna FC
SV Neuberg	1–2	SV Oberwart
SV Thörl	2–1	Union Vöcklamarkt
USK Anif	1–5	ASK Salzburg
Villacher SV	1–1 (a.e.t.) (5–4 p)	Salzburger AK 1914
WSG Wattens	2–1 (a.e.t.)	SC Schwaz

== Second round ==
Team 1	Score	Team 2
14 August 1981
Favoritner AC	1–0	SV Schwechat
SPG Innsbruck	1–1 (a.e.t.) (3–4 p)	WSG Wattens
15 August 1981
ASK Salzburg	0–1	Admira Dornbirn
ASK Voitsberg	1–0	SV Feldkirchen
SV Spittal/Drau	3–0	Chemie Linz
Union Wels	1–2	1. Wiener Neustädter SC
18 August 1981
Kapfenberger SV	1–2	Grazer AK
SK Tamsweg	0–3	SV Austria Salzburg
SV St. Veit	1–3	SK Sturm Graz
SV Thörl	0–4	SK VOEST Linz
Villacher SV	0–2	Linzer ASK
IG Bregenz/Dornbirn	0–1	SSW Innsbruck
SC Eisenstadt	1–0	Wiener Sportclub
First Vienna FC	1–3 (a.e.t.)	FC Admira/Wacker
19 August 1981
1. Simmeringer SC	1–2	SK Rapid Wien
SV Oberwart	1–7	FK Austria Wien

== Third round ==
Team 1	Score	Team 2
1 September 1981
SV Austria Salzburg	1–0	SV Spittal/Drau
Grazer AK	10–0	ASK Voitsberg
SC Eisenstadt	5–3	WSG Wattens
SSW Innsbruck	4–0	Admira Dornbirn
SK VOEST Linz	5–0	Favoritner AC
2 September 1981
FC Admira/Wacker	3–3 (a.e.t.) (3–5 p)	Linzer ASK
SK Sturm Graz	4–0	1. Wiener Neustädter SC
3 September 1981
FK Austria Wien	2–1	SK Rapid Wien

== Quarter-finals ==
Team 1	Score	Team 2
16 March 1982
Grazer AK	1–0	SK VOEST Linz
Linzer ASK	0–2	FK Austria Wien
30 March 1982
SSW Innsbruck	1–0	SC Eisenstadt
SK Sturm Graz	4–1	SV Austria Salzburg

== Semi-finals ==
Team 1	Score	Team 2
13 April 1982
FK Austria Wien	1–1 (a.e.t.) (6–5 p)	Grazer AK
SSW Innsbruck	2–1	SK Sturm Graz

== Final ==
=== First leg ===
20 April 1982
19:00

SSW Innsbruck	0–1	FK Austria Wien
	Report	Zach 90'

Tivoli, Innsbruck
Attendance: 14,000
Referee: Adolf Mathias

=== Second leg ===
12 May 1982
17:15

FK Austria Wien	3–1	SSW Innsbruck
N'Gobe 52'; Baumeister 69'; Petkov 71'	Report

Franz Horr Stadium, Vienna
Attendance: 5,800
Referee: Horst Brummeier

FK Austria Wien won 4–1 on aggregate.
