= 1966–67 Austrian Cup =

Tournament details
- Country: Austria

Final positions
- Champions: Austria Wien
- Runner-up: Linzer ASK

The 1966–67 Austrian Cup (German: ÖFB-Cup) was the 33rd season of Austria's nationwide football cup competition. The final was played over two legs, on 27 June 1967 at the Linzer Stadion, Linz and on 5 July 1967 at the Hohe Warte, Vienna.

The competition was won by Austria Wien after beating Linzer ASK by a drawing lots after the tie finished 2–2 on aggregate.

== Round of 32 ==
| Team 1 | Score | Team 2 |
|---|---|---|
13 August 1966
| SC Schwaz | 2–10 | FC Wacker Innsbruck |
14 August 1966
| FC Wattens | 0–4 | Wiener Sport-Club |
| SV Loipersbach | 2–4 | Admira-Energie Wien |
| WSV ATSV Ranshofen | 1–3 | Austria Klagenfurt |
19 August 1966
| Schwarz-Weiß Bregenz | 4–2 | Grazer AK |
20 August 1966
| SV Austria Salzburg | 1–0 | FS Elektra Wien |
| Badener AC | 1–3 | SK Rapid Wien |
| Klagenfurter AC | 0–5 | First Vienna FC |
| SK Vorwärts Steyr | 3–0 | Kapfenberger SV |
21 August 1966
| 1. Simmeringer SC | 0–3 | FK Austria Wien |
| SC Austria Lustenau | 1–0 | 1. Wiener Neustädter SC |
| Deutschlandsberger SC | 0–1 | 1. Schwechater SC |
| WSV Donawitz | 5–5 (a.e.t.) | FC Lustenau |
| Wacker Wien | 1–0 | SK Sturm Graz |
| Wiener AC | 2–0 | SV Donau Wien |
1 November 1966
| Linzer ASK | 1–0 | SK Bischofshofen |
Replay: 1 October 1966
| FC Lustenau | 1–2 | WSV Donawitz |

== Round of 16 ==
| Team 1 | Score | Team 2 |
|---|---|---|
18 September 1966
| Wiener Sport-Club | 5–1 | SK Vorwärts Steyr |
1 October 1966
| First Vienna FC | 6–1 | SC Austria Lustenau |
19 October 1966
| FK Austria Wien | 2–1 | FC Wacker Innsbruck |
26 October 1966
| 1. Schwechater SC | 3–2 | Wacker Wien |
| SV Austria Salzburg | 1–0 (a.e.t.) | Schwarz-Weiß Bregenz |
| SK Rapid Wien | 3–1 | Austria Klagenfurt |
8 December 1966
| Linzer ASK | 6–0 | Wiener AC |
| WSV Donawitz | 3–1 | Admira-Energie Wien |

== Quarter-finals ==
| Team 1 | Score | Team 2 |
|---|---|---|
25 February 1967
| Linzer ASK | 2–1 | Wiener Sport-Club |
| First Vienna FC | 0–1 | SK Rapid Wien |
| WSV Donawitz | 2–2 (a.e.t.) | FK Austria Wien |
26 February 1967
| 1. Schwechater SC | 5–0 | SV Austria Salzburg |
Replay: 26 April 1967
| FK Austria Wien | 3–0 | WSV Donawitz |

== Semi-finals ==
| Team 1 | Score | Team 2 |
|---|---|---|
3 May 1967
| FK Austria Wien | 1–0 | SK Rapid Wien |
4 May 1967
| Linzer ASK | 5–0 | 1. Schwechater SC |

== Final ==
=== First leg ===
27 June 1967
19:30

| Linzer ASK | 2–1 | FK Austria Wien |
|---|---|---|
| Kondert 47'; Köglberger 57' | Report | Buzek 84' (pen.) |

Linzer Stadion, Linz
Attendance: 17,000
Referee: Alois Kessler

=== Second leg ===
5 July 1967
19:30

| FK Austria Wien | 1–0 | Linzer ASK |
|---|---|---|
| Dirnberger 26' | Report |

Hohe Warte, Vienna
Attendance: 12,000
Referee: Fritz Bauer

2–2 on aggregate. FK Austria Wien won by a drawing lots.
