= 1973–74 Austrian Cup =

Tournament details
- Country: Austria

Final positions
- Champions: Austria/WAC
- Runners-up: Austria Salzburg

The 1973–74 Austrian Cup (German: ÖFB-Cup) was the 40th season of Austria's nationwide football cup competition. The final was played over two legs, on 29 May 1974 at the Praterstadion, Vienna and on 12 June 1974 at the Lehener Stadion, Salzburg.

The competition was won by Austria/WAC after beating Austria Salzburg 3–2 on aggregate.

== First round ==
Team 1	Score	Team 2
4 August 1973
Deutschlandsberger SC	2–2 (a.e.t.) (2–4 p)	SK Sturm Graz
Dornbirner SV	0–3	SK Bischofshofen
FS Elektra Wien	2–1	Admira Wr. Neustadt
KSV Böhlerwerk	0–2	Kapfenberger SV
SC Kufstein	3–1 (a.e.t.)	1. Halleiner SK
SV St. Veit	2–1 (a.e.t.)	SV Grieskirchen
WSV Rosental	3–1	Magdalener SC
ÖTSU Henndorf	2–3 (a.e.t.)	Blau-Weiß Feldkirch
5 August 1973
ASV Kittsee	2–4	1. Wiener Neustädter SC
FC Dornbirn	1–0	Salzburger AK 1914
IG Bregenz/Bludenz	3–0	ESV Austria Innsbruck
Landstraßer AC Wien	1–1 (a.e.t.) (2–3 p)	SC Tulln
SV Mattersburg	0–3	SV Heid Stockerau

== Second round ==
Team 1	Score	Team 2
11 August 1973
SV Heid Stockerau	2–2 (a.e.t.) (2–3 p)	Linzer ASK
12 August 1973
ASK Eggendorf	0–4	SC Eisenstadt
Blau-Weiß Feldkirch	0–3	FC Admira/Wacker
FC Dornbirn	0–0 (a.e.t.) (5–4 p)	1. Simmeringer SC
15 August 1973
1. Wiener Neustädter SC	2–1	Grazer AK
ASK St. Valentin	0–2	Donawitzer SV Alpine
FS Elektra Wien	2–1	First Vienna FC
IG Bregenz/Bludenz	2–3 (a.e.t.)	SV Austria Salzburg
Kapfenberger SV	1–2	Wiener Sport-Club
SC Kufstein	0–1	Austria/WAC
SC Tulln	0–1 (a.e.t.)	SWW Innsbruck
SV St. Veit	1–0	FC Vorarlberg
SK VÖEST Linz	3–0	SK Sturm Graz
WSK Kaprun	1–9	SK Austria Klagenfurt
WSV Rosental	0–2	WSG Radenthein/Villacher SV
2 September 1973
SK Bischofshofen	0–2	SK Rapid Wien

== Third round ==
Team 1	Score	Team 2
24 November 1973
1. Wiener Neustädter SC	1–1 (a.e.t.) (4–2 p)	WSG Radenthein/Villacher SV
SK Austria Klagenfurt	1–2 (a.e.t.)	FC Dornbirn
SV Austria Salzburg	2–1	SC Eisenstadt
2 December 1973
Donawitzer SV Alpine	2–2 (a.e.t.) (7–6 p)	SK VÖEST Linz
4 December 1973
SWW Innsbruck	2–1	Linzer ASK
16 February 1974
Austria/WAC	3–0	SV St. Veit
23 February 1974
FS Elektra Wien	1–2	SK Rapid Wien
27 February 1974
Wiener Sport-Club	1–3	FC Admira/Wacker

== Quarter-finals ==
The first legs were played on 6 March, while the second legs were played on 3 April 1974.

Team 1	Agg.	Team 2	1st leg	2nd leg
1. Wiener Neustädter SC	1–6	SWW Innsbruck	1–2	0–4
FC Admira/Wacker	1–5	Austria/WAC	1–2	0–3
SV Austria Salzburg	3–1	Donawitzer SV Alpine	0–0	3–1
SK Rapid Wien	8–0	FC Dornbirn	3–0	5–0

== Semi-finals ==
The first legs were played on 17 April, while the second legs were played on 22 May 1974.

Team 1	Agg.	Team 2	1st leg	2nd leg
SK Rapid Wien	3–10	Austria/WAC	2–6	1–4
SWW Innsbruck	2–3	SV Austria Salzburg	1–2	1–1

== Final ==
=== First leg ===
29 May 1974
19:30

Austria/WAC	2–1	SV Austria Salzburg
Fiala 74'; Prohaska 85'	Report	Bacher 10'

Praterstadion, Vienna
Attendance: 11,000
Referee: Paul Drabek

=== Second leg ===
12 June 1974
18:30

SV Austria Salzburg	1–1	Austria/WAC
Hala 58'	Report	Prohaska 84'

Lehener Stadion, Salzburg
Attendance: 17,000
Referee: Adolf Mathias

Austria/WAC won 3–2 on aggregate.
