= Herbert Prohaska =

Austrian footballer (born 1955)

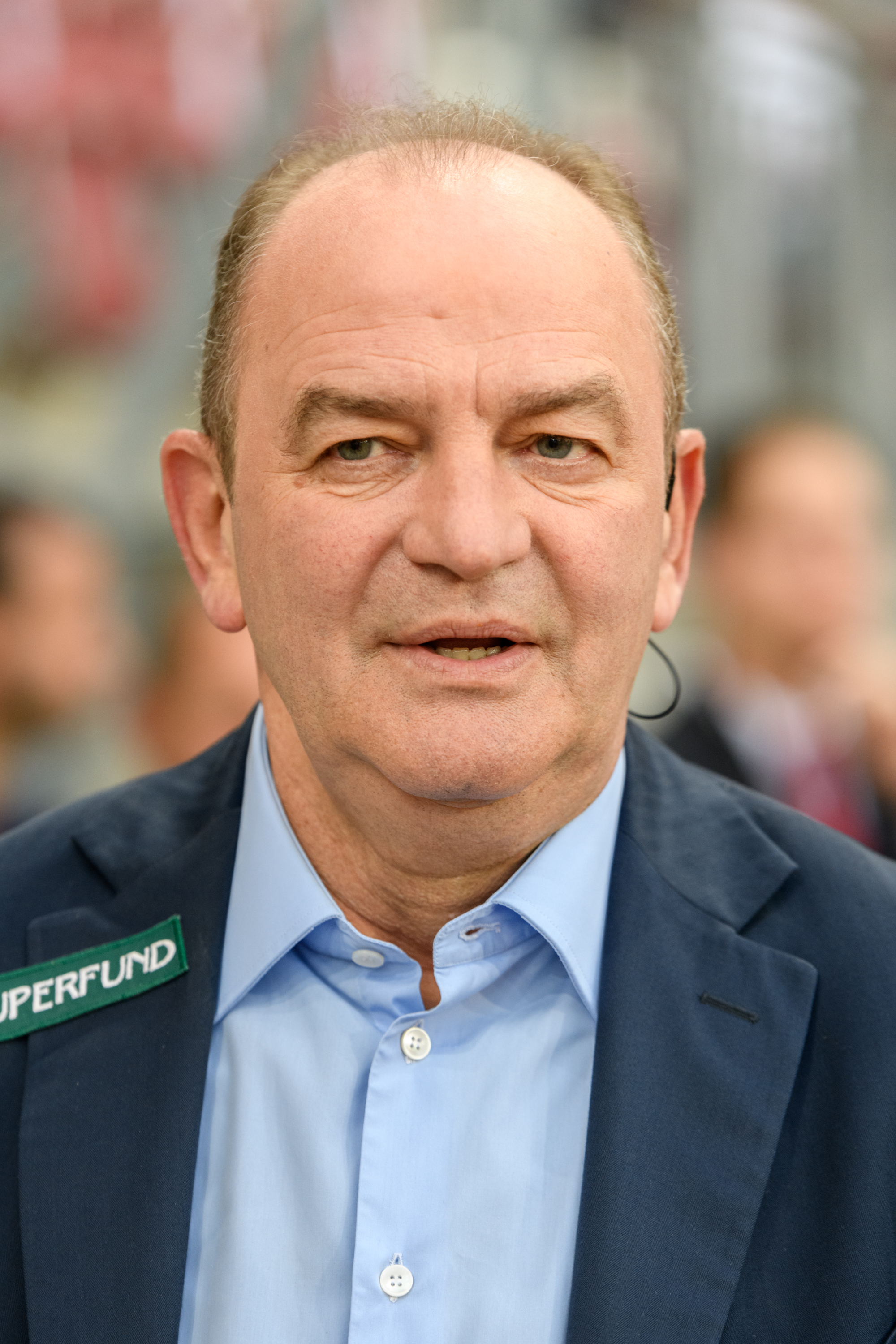
- Prohaska in 2018

Personal information
- Date of birth: 8 August 1955 (age 71)
- Place of birth: Vienna, Austria
- Height: 1.80 m (5 ft 11 in)
- Position: Midfielder

Youth career
- Vorwärts XI
- 1970–1972: Ostbahn XI

Senior career*
| Years | Team | Apps | (Gls) |
| 1972–1980 | Austria Wien | 259 | (62) |
| 1980–1982 | Inter Milan | 56 | (8) |
| 1982–1983 | Roma | 26 | (3) |
| 1983–1989 | Austria Wien | 194 | (35) |
| Total | | 535 | (108) |

International career
| 1974–1989 | Austria | 83 | (10) |

Managerial career
- 1990–1992: Austria Wien
- 1993–1999: Austria
- 1999–2000: Austria Wien
- * Club domestic league appearances and goals

Herbert Prohaska (German pronunciation: [ˈhɛʁbɛʁt pʁoˈhaska, - ˈpʁɔhaska]; born 8 August 1955) is an Austrian former professional footballer. He ranks among Austria's greatest football players of all time. Prohaska works as a football pundit for the Austrian Broadcasting Corporation (ORF). His nickname "Schneckerl", Viennese dialect for curly hair, derives from his curly haircut in his younger years. A talented, elegant, and combative midfielder, Prohaska played as a deep-lying playmaker, and was known for his technique, intelligence, and precise passing.

== Club career ==
Born in Vienna, Austria, Prohaska started his professional career in 1972 at Austria Wien. With Prohaska as playmaker of the team, Austria won four Austrian Football Bundesliga titles and three Austrian Cups, and reached the final of the 1978 Cup Winners' Cup and the semi-finals of the European Cup. In 1980, he joined Inter Milan, and won the Italian Cup in his second season with the nerazzurri. In 1982, he moved to A.S. Roma, where he won the Italian championship in his first year. He returned to Austria Wien in 1983. In his second stint with the club, Prohaska won three Austrian Football Bundesliga titles and one Austrian Cup.

== International career ==
Prohaska made his debut for Austria in a November 1974 friendly match against Turkey and was a participant at the 1978 and 1982 FIFA World Cups. He earned 83 caps, scoring 10 goals. His final international was a June 1989 World Cup qualification match against Iceland, but he retired before the 1990 World Cup, while Austria qualified for the tournament.

== Managerial career ==
In 1989, Prohaska retired from playing. Shortly after his retirement, he served as Austria Wien's coach, winning two Austrian Bundesliga titles and two Austrian Cups.

In 1993, he became manager of the Austria national team, qualifying as group winners for the 1998 World Cup in France. In 1999, he resigned after a disastrous 9–0 defeat to Spain. From 1999 to 2000, he returned to managing Austria Wien.

== Awards ==
In November 2003, Prohaska was selected as the Golden Player of Austria by the Austrian Football Association as their most outstanding player of the past 50 years. In August 2004, he was voted the Austrian Footballer of the Century as the Austrian Football Association celebrated its 100th anniversary.

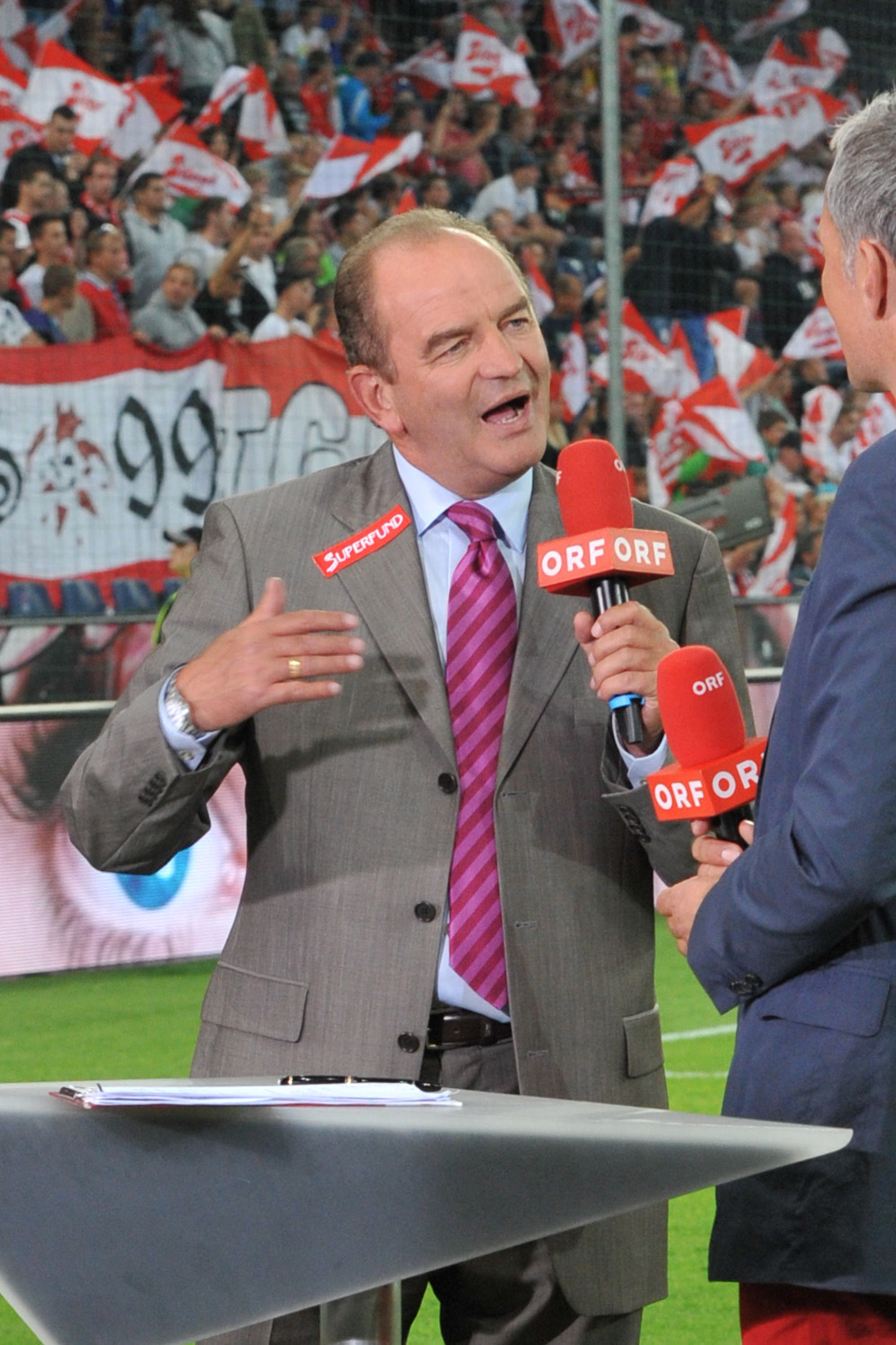
Prohaska working for the ORF in 2013

== Media work ==
Working as a pundit for the Austrian Broadcasting Corporation ORF, Prohaska suggested at the 2006 World Cup that referee Graham Poll's famous yellow card blunder was a result of heavy alcohol consumption before the match.

== Personal life ==
Prohaska's been married to his wife Elisabeth since 1974, and the couple has two children and four grandchildren. Prohaska is Roman Catholic.

== Honours ==
=== Player ===
Austria Wien

- Austrian Bundesliga (7): 1975–76, 1977–78, 1978–79, 1979–80, 1983–84, 1984–85, 1985–86
- Austrian Cup (4): 1973-74, 1976-77, 1979-80, 1985-86

Inter Milan

- Coppa Italia (1): 1981-82

Roma

- Serie A (1): 1982-83

Individual

- Austrian Player of the Year (Krone-Fußballerwahl): 1975, 1985
- Austrian Player of the Year (APA-Fußballerwahl): 1984, 1985, 1988
- UEFA Jubilee Awards (Austria's Golden Player): 2004

=== Manager ===
Austria Wien

- Austrian Bundesliga (2): 1990–91, 1991–92
- Austrian Cup (2): 1989-90, 1991-92
- Austrian Manager of the Year (Krone-Fußballerwahl): 1997
