= 1967–68 Austrian Cup =

Tournament details
- Country: Austria

Final positions
- Champions: Rapid Wien
- Runner-up: Grazer AK

The 1967–68 Austrian Cup (German: ÖFB-Cup) was the 34th season of Austria's nationwide football cup competition. The final was held at the Praterstadion, Vienna on 23 May 1968.

The competition was won by Rapid Wien after beating Grazer AK 2–0.

== First round ==
| Team 1 | Score | Team 2 |
|---|---|---|
12 August 1967
| 1. Wiener Neustädter SC | 0–1 | SK Rapid Wien |
| SV Austria Salzburg | 10–0 | Rennweger SV |
| FC Wien | 0–1 | FC Wacker Innsbruck |
| Kapfenberger SV | 1–1 (a.e.t.) | WSG Wattens |
| SK Vorwärts Steyr | 1–2 | Amateure Steyr |
| WSG Radenthein | 4–0 | FC Lustenau |
| Wacker Wien | 2–2^{1} | SK Austria Klagenfurt |
13 August 1967
| 1. Schwechater SC | 2–2 (a.e.t.) | Linzer ASK |
| SC Austria Lustenau | 3–4 | SK Sturm Graz |
| SC Pinkafeld | 2–4 | First Vienna FC |
| SCG Brunn/Gebirge | 3–1 | SC Eisenstadt |
| SK Bischofshofen | 1–4 | Admira-Energie Wien |
| SV Urfahr | 0–8 | FK Austria Wien |
15 August 1967
| Magdalener SC | 0–1 (a.e.t.) | Wiener Sport-Club |
| SC Kufstein | 1–4 | Schwarz-Weiß Bregenz |
24 September 1967
| SC Bruck/Mur | 1–5 | Grazer AK |
Replay: 23 September 1967
| Wacker Wien | 2–1 (a.e.t.) | SK Austria Klagenfurt |
Replay: 24 September 1967
| WSG Wattens | 0–1 (a.e.t.) | Kapfenberger SV |
Replay: 26 October 1967
| Linzer ASK | 4–2 (a.e.t.) | 1. Schwechater SC |

- ^{1} The match was replayed because the referee did not start the extra time after the final whistle. Wacker did not play after the 15 min break, because two players had left the stadium.

== Second round ==
| Team 1 | Score | Team 2 |
|---|---|---|
23 September 1967
| First Vienna FC | 4–2 (a.e.t.) | WSG Radenthein |
14 October 1967
| Wacker Wien | 3–1 | Wiener Sport-Club |
25 October 1967
| Schwarz-Weiß Bregenz | 0–0 (a.e.t.) | Amateure Steyr |
26 October 1967
| FK Austria Wien | 2–0 | Admira-Energie Wien |
| Kapfenberger SV | 1–3 | Grazer AK |
| SK Rapid Wien | 2–0 | FC Wacker Innsbruck |
| SGC Brunn/Gebirge | 0–1 | SV Austria Salzburg |
1 November 1967
| Linzer ASK | 1–0 | SK Sturm Graz |
Replay: 4 November 1967
| Amateure Steyr | 1–2 | Schwarz-Weiß Bregenz |

== Quarter-finals ==
| Team 1 | Score | Team 2 |
|---|---|---|
8 December 1967
| Grazer AK | 1–0 | SV Austria Salzburg |
| SK Rapid Wien | 4–3 (a.e.t.) | FK Austria Wien |
10 December 1967
| Schwarz-Weiß Bregenz | 1–0 | Linzer ASK |
| Wacker Wien | 2–1 | First Vienna |

== Semi-finals ==
| Team 1 | Score | Team 2 |
|---|---|---|
27 April 1968
| Grazer AK | 2–0 | Schwarz-Weiß Bregenz |
28 April 1968
| Wacker Wien | 0–3 | SK Rapid Wien |

== Final ==
23 May 1968
17:15

| SK Rapid Wien | 2–0 | Grazer AK |
|---|---|---|
| Fritsch 41'; Kaltenbrunner 88' (pen.) | Report |

Praterstadion, Vienna
Attendance: 7,180
Referee: Ferdinand Marschall
