= 1958–59 Austrian Cup =

Tournament details
- Country: Austria

Final positions
- Champions: Wiener AC
- Runners-up: Rapid Wien

The 1958–59 Austrian Cup (German: ÖFB-Cup) was the 25th season of Austria's nationwide football cup competition, and the first season after a nine-year hiatus since the competition was not played because of lack of interest and money for the Austrian Football Association. The final was held at the Praterstadion, Vienna on 24 June 1959.

The competition was won by Wiener AC after beating Rapid Wien 2–0.

== Round of 32 ==
Team 1	Score	Team 2
28 March 1959
Linzer ASK	4–1	ÖMV Olympia Stadlau
BSV St. Pölten	3–2 (a.e.t.)	Admira Wien
29 March 1959
1. Schwechater SC	2–1	Kremser SC
WSV Fohnsdorf	5–0	SC Austria Lustenau
8 April 1959
1. Wiener Neustädter SC	1–3	SK Rapid Wien
SV Austria Salzburg	3–1	1. Simmeringer SC
FC Wien	0–6	Wiener AC
FC ÖMV Stadlau	3–0	SC Bruck/Mur
Kapfenberger SV	10–1	ASV Neufeld
SC Helfort Wien	1–3	Wacker Wien
SVS Linz	1–2	FK Austria Wien
SK Sturm Graz	0–1	Grazer AK
SK Vorwärts Steyr	3–1	WSG Radenthein
WSV Donawitz	5–3	ASV Siegendorf
Wiener Sport-Club	6–2	Innsbrucker SK
30 April 1959
Polizei SV Linz	2–9	First Vienna FC

== Round of 16 ==
Team 1	Score	Team 2
7 May 1959
SV Austria Salzburg	2–1	WSV Fohnsdorf
FC ÖMV Stadlau	1–2	Wacker Wien
Grazer AK	5–1	1. Schwechater SC
Linzer ASK	0–1	'First Vienna FC
BSV St. Pölten	1–8	SK Rapid Wien
SK Vorwarts Steyr	1–0	Kapfenberger SV
Wiener Sport-Club	1–2	Wiener AC
WSV Donawitz	0–3	FK Austria Wien

== Quarter-finals ==
Team 1	Score	Team 2
27 May 1959
SK Rapid Wien	2–1	FK Austria Wien
'First Vienna FC	1–0	SK Vorwarts Steyr
28 May 1959
SV Austria Salzburg	1–2 (a.e.t.)	Grazer AK
Wacker Wien	1–3	Wiener AC

== Semi-finals ==
Team 1	Score	Team 2
9 June 1959
First Vienna FC	1–4	Wiener AC
17 June 1959
SK Rapid Wien	3–0	Grazer AK

== Final ==
24 June 1959
19:15

Wiener AC	2–0	SK Rapid Wien
Zaglitsch 23' (o.g.); Kaltenbrunner 75'	Report

Praterstadion, Vienna
Attendance: 10,000
Referee: Friedrich Seipelt
