= 1960–61 Austrian Cup =

Tournament details
- Country: Austria

Final positions
- Champions: Rapid Wien
- Runners-up: First Vienna

The 1960–61 Austrian Cup (German: ÖFB-Cup) was the 27th season of Austria's nationwide football cup competition. The final was held at the Praterstadion, Vienna on 22 June 1961.

The competition was won by Rapid Wien after beating First Vienna 3–1.

== Preliminary round ==
Team 1	Score	Team 2
1 November 1960
Amateure Steyr	4–0	WSV Fohnsdorf
SK Austria Klagenfurt	2–0	SV Straßenbahn Wien
SC Austria Lustenau	4–2	KSV Ortmann
ESV Austria Graz	2–1	ASK Gloggnitz
FC ÖMV Stadlau	5–1	SV Mattersburg
Phönix Hönigsberg	2–1	Welser SC
SK VÖEST Linz	6–0	1. Oberndorfer SK 1920
WSG Radenthein	6–4	Klagenfurter AC
20 November 1960
ASV Hohenau	0–0	FC Lustenau
Admira-Energie Wien	5–1	SC Kufstein
4 December 1960
1. Halleiner SK	1–3	SV Kirchbichl
SK Bischofshofen	9–3	SV Wattens
Salzburger AK 1914	7–1	FC Wacker Innsbruck
8 December 1960
Kapfenberger SV	1–4 (a.e.t.)	FS Elektra Wien
WSV Donawitz	1–1 (a.e.t.)	SK Sturm Graz
11 December 1960
Blau-Weiß Feldkirch	3–4	ASV Siegendorf
Innsbrucker SK	4–6	Kremser SC
Nussdorfer AC	2–3	VOITH St. Pölten
Replay: 11 December 1960
SK Sturm Graz	3–1	WSV Donawitz

== Round of 32 ==
Team 1	Score	Team 2
8 December 1960
SK Austria Klagenfurt	2–3 (a.e.t.)	Salzburger AK 1914
11 December 1960
1. Schwechater SC	2–1	Amateure Steyr
Grazer AK	8–0	SC Austria Lustenau
17 December 1960
1. Simmeringer SC	7–1	VOITH St. Pölten
18 December 1960
ASV Hohenau	3–3 (a.e.t.)	SV Austria Salzburg
ASV Siegendorf	1–3	Admira-Energie Wien
FK Austria Wien	2–1	Wiener Sport-Club
ESV Austria Graz	7–0	SV Kirchbichl
FC Dornbirn	0–4	1. Wiener Neustädter SC
FC ÖMV Stadlau	3–1	SVS Linz
FS Elektra Wien	0–1	Wacker Wien
Kremser SC	2–3	SK Bischofshofen
First Vienna FC	2–0	Phönix Hönigsberg
SK VÖEST Linz	6–5 (a.e.t.)	SK Sturm Graz
26 December 1960
SK Rapid Wien	4–1	Linzer ASK
19 February 1961
Wiener AC	3–1	WSG Radenthein
Replay: 19 February 1961
SV Austria Salzburg	5–1	ASV Hohenau

== Round of 16 ==
Team 1	Score	Team 2
18 February 1961
Admira-Energie Wien	2–0 (a.e.t.)	1. Simmeringer SC
19 February 1961
1. Wiener Neustädter SC	1–3	First Vienna FC
1. Schwechater SC	3–2 (a.e.t.)	FK Austria Wien
Grazer AK	3–2	SV Austria Salzburg
SK Rapid Wien	7–2	SK Bischofshofen
SK VÖEST Linz	0–1	Wacker Wien
FC ÖMV Stadlau	3–1	ESV Austria Graz
19 April 1961
Salzburger AK 1914	0–0	Wiener AC

== Quarter-finals ==
Team 1	Score	Team 2
10 May 1961
Grazer AK	4–2	FC ÖMV Stadlau
11 May 1961
Admira-Energie Wien	2–0	1. Schwechater SC
SK Rapid Wien	2–1	Wiener AC
First Vienna FC	4–4 (a.e.t.)	Wacker Wien
Replay: 31 May 1961
Wacker Wien	0–9	First Vienna FC

== Semi-finals ==
Team 1	Score	Team 2
1 June 1961
SK Rapid Wien	3–1	Admira-Energie Wien
14 June 1961
First Vienna FC	4–3 (a.e.t.)	Grazer AK

== Final ==
22 June 1961
19:00

SK Rapid Wien	3–1	First Vienna FC
Flögel 55'; Seitl 73'; Reiter 77'	Report	Aust 57'

Praterstadion, Vienna
Attendance: 10,000
Referee: Friedrich Seipelt
