= 1964–65 Austrian Cup =

Tournament details
- Country: Austria

Final positions
- Champions: Linzer ASK
- Runner-up: Wiener Neustädter SC

The 1964–65 Austrian Cup (German: ÖFB-Cup) was the 31st season of Austria's nationwide football cup competition. The final was played over two legs, on 24 June 1965 at the Stadion Wiener Neustadt, Wiener Neustadt and on 26 June 1965 at the LASK-Platz, Linz.

The competition was won by Linzer ASK after beating Wiener Neustädter SC 1–0 on aggregate.

== Round of 32 ==
Team 1	Score	Team 2
15 August 1964
1. Simmeringer SC	3–1	Wiener Sport-Club
Austria Klagenfurt	1–0	Wacker Wien
SV Austria Salzburg	2–1	Grazer AK
FC Dornbirn	2–3	First Vienna FC
FC Wien	4–1	1. Schwechater SC
Kremser SC	1–3 (a.e.t.)	1. Wiener Neustädter SC
SC Marchegg	1–0	FK Austria Wien
SK Bischofshofen	3–1	Post-Admira Linz
SV Deutschkreutz	0–3	SK Rapid Wien
SVS Linz	2–3 (a.e.t.)	Linzer ASK
WSV ATSV Ranshofen	3–2	Wiener AC
WSV Judenburg	1–2 (a.e.t.)	ASK Gloggnitz
Wacker Innsbruck	2–2 (a.e.t.)	Admira-Energie Wien
16 August 1964
Klagenfurter AC	0–3	Schwarz-Weiß Bregenz
SC Kufstein	3–1	SV Wattens
SK Sturm Graz	2–1	Kapfenberger SV
Replay: 29 September 1964
Admira Energie	4–0	Wacker Innsbruck

== Round of 16 ==
Team 1	Score	Team 2
10 October 1964
1. Simmeringer SC	1–3 (a.e.t.)	1. Wiener Neustädter SC
SK Rapid Wien	7–0	ASK Gloggnitz
11 October 1964
Schwarz-Weiß Bregenz	5–3 (a.e.t.)	SV Austria Salzburg
WSV ATSV Ranshofen	4–2	SC Kufstein
14 October 1964
Admira-Energie Wien	4–1	First Vienna FC
SK Sturm Graz	5–2	FC Wien
20 December 1964
Linzer ASK	3–0	Austria Klagenfurt
12 May 1965
SK Bischofshofen	1–0	SC Marchegg

== Quarter-finals ==
Team 1	Score	Team 2
6 December 1964
Schwarz-Weiß Bregenz	2–2 (a.e.t.)	WSV ATSV Ranshofen
17 April 1965
SK Sturm Graz	3–3 (a.e.t.)	Linzer ASK
16 May 1965
SK Bischofshofen	0–0 (a.e.t.)	1. Wiener Neustädter SC
19 May 1965
Admira-Energie Wien	1–0	SK Rapid Wien
Replay: 16 May 1965
Schwarz-Weiß Bregenz	2–2 (a.e.t.)^{1}	WSV ATSV Ranshofen
1. Wiener Neustädter SC	6–1	SK Bischofshofen
Replay: 26 May 1965
Linzer ASK	3–0^{2}	SK Sturm Graz

- ^{1} Schwarz-Weiß Bregenz won on the drawing lots.
- ^{2} The original replay played on 16 May was abandoned in the 45th minute due to rain.

== Semi-finals ==
Team 1	Score	Team 2
17 June 1965
Linzer ASK	2–1	Admira Energie Wien
Schwarz-Weiß Bregenz	0–1	1. Wiener Neustädter SC

== Final ==
24 June 1965
18:00

1. Wiener Neustädter SC	0–1	Linzer ASK
	Report	Lima 89'

Stadion Wiener Neustadt, Wiener Neustadt
Attendance: 7,000
Referee: Paul Schiller

=== Second leg ===
26 June 1965
18:00

Linzer ASK	1–1	1. Wiener Neustädter SC
Viehböck 10'	Report	Bierbaumer 24'

LASK-Platz, Linz
Attendance: 8,000
Referee: Dimitrios Wlachojanis

Linzer ASK won 2–1 on aggregate.
