= 1976–77 Austrian Cup =

Tournament details
- Country: Austria

Final positions
- Champions: Austria/WAC
- Runners-up: Wiener Sport-Club/Post

The 1976–77 Austrian Cup (German: ÖFB-Cup) was the 43rd season of Austria's nationwide football cup competition. The final was played over two legs, on 14 June 1977 at the Sport-Club Platz, Vienna and on 29 June 1977 at the Weststadion, Vienna.

The competition was won by Austria/WAC after beating Wiener Sport-Club/Post 4–0 on aggregate.

== First round ==
Team 1	Score	Team 2
6 August 1976
SC Eisenstadt	0–2	SV Heid Stockerau
7 August 1976
ASK Salzburg	2–4	1. Halleiner SK
ATSV Wolfsberg	0–3	Wolfsberger AC
ATUS Bärnbach	1–0	Donawitzer SV Alpine
Antonshof Wien	1–0	1. Simmeringer SC
SC Austria Lustenau	1–1 (a.e.t.) (5–6 p)	SPG Amateure Wattens
FC Waidhofen/Ybbs	1–2	Wiener Sport-Club/Post
Floridsdorfer AC	1–2	KSV Böhlerwerk
Hertha Wels	4–4 (a.e.t.) (7–6 p)	Kapfenberger SV
Rapid Lienz	2–1	Villacher SV
SC Gaswerk/Straßenbahn	0–1	Kremser SC
SV Arnoldstein	0–2	SK Austria Klagenfurt
SV Flavia Solva	5–2	SC Amateure St. Veit
SV St. Veit	9–1	WSV Liezen
SVg Mayrhofen	1–3	Schwarz-Weiß Bregenz
USV Rudersdorf	3–0	SC Pinkafeld
Vorwärts Steyr	0–0 (a.e.t.) (4–3 p)	Amateure Steyr
WSK Kaprun	1–2	Rätia Bludenz
8 August 1976
Badener AC	2–4	1. Wiener Neustädter SC
Blau-Weiß Feldkirch	0–4	FC Dornbirn
SV Jenbach	2–3	Salzburger AK 1914
SV Leithaprodersdorf	2–4	SC Tulln

== Second round ==
Team 1	Score	Team 2
29 September 1976
SV St. Veit	1–0	SK Sturm Graz
26 October 1976
1. Wiener Neustädter SC	1–3	First Vienna FC
ATUS Bärnbach	1–1 (a.e.t.) (3–2 p)	Vorwärts Steyr
SK Austria Klagenfurt	0–1	Linzer ASK
FC Dornbirn	0–1	SSW Innsbruck
KSV Böhlerwerk	1–2	Wiener Sport-Club/Post
Kremser SC	1–2	SK Rapid Wien
Rapid Lienz	0–4	SK VÖEST Linz
Rätia Bludenz	4–1	1. Halleiner SK
SC Tulln	0–1	FC Admira/Wacker
SV Flavia Solva	0–2	Hertha Wels
SV Heid Stockerau	2–0	Antonshof Wien
Schwarz-Weiß Bregenz	1–0	Salzburger AK 1914
USV Rudersdorf	1–4	Austria/WAC
SPG Amateure Wattens	1–1 (a.e.t.) (2–3 p)	SV Austria Salzburg
Wolfsberger AC	1–4	Grazer AK

== Third round ==
Team 1	Score	Team 2
1 May 1977
Grazer AK	3–2	SK VÖEST Linz
Hertha Wels	0–3	Wiener Sport-Club/Post
SV St. Veit	3–0	ATUS Bärnbach
3 May 1977
SV Austria Salzburg	0–0 (a.e.t.) (3–1 p)	SV Heid Stockerau
Austria/WAC	12–0	Rätia Bludenz
Linzer ASK	2–1	First Vienna FC
SSW Innsbruck	3–1	SK Rapid Wien
Schwarz-Weiß Bregenz	0–3	FC Admira/Wacker

== Quarter-finals ==
Team 1	Score	Team 2
17 May 1977
SSW Innsbruck	4–1	Linzer ASK
18 May 1977
FC Admira/Wacker	0–3	Austria/WAC
19 May 1977
SV St. Veit	1–1 (a.e.t.) (5–4 p)	SV Austria Salzburg
Wiener Sport-Club/Post	1–0	Grazer AK

== Semi-finals ==
Team 1	Score	Team 2
8 June 1977
Austria/WAC	3–0	SSW Innsbruck
9 June 1977
SV St. Veit	1–2	Wiener Sport-Club/Post

== Final ==
=== First leg ===
14 June 1977
19:45

Wiener Sport-Club/Post	0–1	Austria/WAC
	Report	Morales 82'

Sport-Club Platz, Vienna
Attendance: 8,700
Referee: Franz Wöhrer

=== Second leg ===
29 June 1977
19:00

Austria/WAC	3–0	Wiener Sport-Club/Post
Pirkner 4'; Prohaska 31'; Morales 89'	Report

Weststadion, Vienna
Attendance: 13,000
Referee: Erich Linemayr

Austria/WAC won 4–0 on aggregate.
