= 1975–76 Austrian Cup =

Tournament details
- Country: Austria

Final positions
- Champions: Rapid Wien
- Runners-up: SSW Innsbruck

The 1975–76 Austrian Cup (German: ÖFB-Cup) was the 42nd season of Austria's nationwide football cup competition. The final was played over two legs, on 2 June 1976 at the Tivoli, Innsbruck and on 8 June 1976 at the Praterstadion, Vienna.

The competition was won by Rapid Wien after beating SSW Innsbruck on away goals rule after the tie finished 3–3 on aggregate.

== First round ==
Team 1	Score	Team 2
2 August 1975
ATSV Wolfsberg	4–0	SK Bischofshofen
ATUS Bärnbach	0–1 (a.e.t.)	WSG Radenthein/Villacher SV
Hütteldorfer AC	3–0	ASV Kittsee
Rennweger SV	0–1	SC Eisenstadt
SC Kufstein	0–3	SC Austria Lustenau
SC Kundl	4–1	ASK Salzburg
SV Feldbach	1–1 (a)	Wolfsberger AC
SV Güssing	2–3	First Vienna FC
SV St. Veit	0–2	SC Tulln
SV Traun	0–2	Kremser SC
SV Waidhofen/Thaya	0–3	Wiener Sport-Club/Post
USV Rudersdorf	3–0	1. Schwechater SC
Vorwärts Steyr	2–0	SV Heid Stockerau
WSV Liezen	0–2	Rapid Lienz
3 August 1975
Dornbirner SV	1–1 (a)	Salzburger AK 1914
ESV Saafelden	0–3	Schwarz-Weiß Bregenz
Innsbrucker SV/SK	4–0	Rätia Bludenz
KSV Böhlerwerk	2–3	1. Wiener Neustädter SC
Magdalener SC	0–0 (a.e.t.) (4–2 p)	Donawitzer SV Alpine
SC Amateure St. Veit	0–1 (a.e.t.)	Kapfenberger SV
SV Bürmoos	1–4	FC Dornbirn
Union Wels	0–3 (a.e.t.)	1. Simmeringer SC

== Second round ==
Team 1	Score	Team 2
15 August 1975
1. Simmeringer SC	2–2 (a)	1. Wiener Neustädter SC
ATSV Wolfsberg	3–4	Linzer ASK
Kapfenberger SV	1–3	Grazer AK
Magdalener SC	1–2	SK VÖEST Linz
SC Tulln	4–3	Austria/WAC
Salzburger AK 1914	1–1 (a)	FC Dornbirn
Schwarz-Weiß Bregenz	0–2	SV Austria Salzburg
16 August 1975
SC Austria Lustenau	0–3	SSW Innsbruck
Hütteldorfer AC	1–3	FC Admira/Wacker
Kremser SC	2–4	Wiener Sport-Club
Rapid Lienz	2–1	Wolfsberger AC
USV Rudersdorf	1–5	SK Rapid Wien
First Vienna FC	0–2	SC Eisenstadt
WSG Radenthein/Villacher SV	2–1	SK Austria Klagenfurt
17 August 1975
Innsbrucker SV/SK	2–1	SC Kundl
Vorwärts Steyr	0–1	SK Sturm Graz

== Third round ==
Team 1	Score	Team 2
21 February 1976
SK Sturm Graz	3–2	SV Austria Salzburg
9 April 1976
Grazer AK	1–2	Wiener Sport-Club/Post
SC Eisenstadt	1–2	SK Rapid Wien
10 April 1976
1. Wiener Neustädter SC	0–1	Villacher SV
FC Dornbirn	3–2	SC Tulln
Rapid Lienz	1–0	Linzer ASK
SSW Innsbruck	0–0 (a.e.t.) (4–3 p)	FC Admira/Wacker
11 April 1976
Innsbrucker SV/SK	0–1	SK VÖEST Linz

== Quarter-finals ==
Team 1	Score	Team 2
4 May 1976
FC Dornbirn	2–2 (a)	SK VÖEST Linz
Rapid Lienz	3–1	Wiener Sport-Club/Post
SK Rapid Wien	2–1	Villacher SV
SSW Innsbruck	2–0	SK Sturm Graz

== Semi-finals ==
Team 1	Score	Team 2
11 May 1976
SK Rapid Wien	3–1	SK VÖEST Linz
SSW Innsbruck	2–1	Rapid Lienz

== Final ==
=== First leg ===
2 June 1976
19:30

SSW Innsbruck	2–1	SK Rapid Wien
Koncilia 8', 53'	Report	Pregesbauer 82'

Tivoli, Innsbruck
Attendance: 8,000
Referee: Horst Brummeier

=== Second leg ===
8 June 1976
19:00

SK Rapid Wien	1–0	SSW Innsbruck
Pawlek 89'	Report

Praterstadion, Vienna
Attendance: 15,000
Referee: Erich Linemayr

2–2 on aggregate. SK Rapid Wien won on away goals.
