= 1963–64 Austrian Cup =

Tournament details
- Country: Austria

Final positions
- Champions: Admira-Energie Wien
- Runner-up: Austria Wien

The 1963–64 Austrian Cup (German: ÖFB-Cup) was the 30th season of Austria's nationwide football cup competition. The final was held at the Praterstadion, Vienna on 1 July 1964.

The competition was won by Admira-Energie Wien after beating Austria Wien 1–0.

== Round of 32 ==
Team 1	Score	Team 2
1 December 1963
ASKÖ Steyrermühl	2–4	FK Austria Wien
Schwarz-Weiß Bregenz	1–2	SV Austria Salzburg
FC Wacker Innsbruck	3–4 (a.e.t.)	ASV Neufeld
15 December 1963
1. Wiener Neustädter SC	3–2	Linzer ASK
ASK St. Valentin	3–3 (a.e.t.)	ASV Siegendorf
SC Austria Lustenau	2–4	Admira-Energie Wien
FC Dornbirn	2–2 (a.e.t.)	Austria Klagenfurt
Kapfenberger SV	6–2	Klagenfurter AC
Kremser SC	0–2	SK Sturm Graz
SC Kufstein	2–0	Wiener AC
SK Bischofshofen	3–2 (a.e.t.)	1. Schwechater SC
Wacker Wien	0–5	SK Rapid Wien
Wiener Sport-Club	12–1	ASK Köflach
12 January 1964
SVS Linz	5–0	ASV Hohenau
9 February 1964
1. Simmeringer SC	1–0	Grazer AK
16 February 1964
Rapid Oberlaa	1–3	First Vienna FC
Replay: 8 February 1964
ASV Siegendorf	0–4	ASK St. Valentin
Replay: 23 February 1964
Austria Klagenfurt	1–2	FC Dornbirn

== Round of 16 ==
Team 1	Score	Team 2
15 February 1964
Admira-Energie Wien	2–0	SVS Linz
16 February 1964
1. Simmeringer SC	3–0	SK Bischofshofen
23 February 1964
FK Austria Wien	3–0	1. Wiener Neustädter SC
SK Sturm Graz	4–3	ASV Neufeld
28 March 1964
SV Austria Salzburg	1–1 (a.e.t.)	Wiener Sport-Club
29 March 1964
FC Dornbirn	2–3 (a.e.t.)	Kapfenberger SV
15 April 1964
ASK St. Valentin	2–3	First Vienna FC
SC Kufstein	1–2	SK Rapid Wien
Replay: 14 April 1964
Wiener Sport-Club	2–1	SV Austria Salzburg

== Quarter-finals ==
Team 1	Score	Team 2
18 May 1964
1. Simmeringer SC	0–2	Admira-Energie Wien
20 May 1964
FK Austria Wien	2–1	First Vienna FC
SK Rapid Wien	3–2 (a.e.t.)	Wiener Sport-Club
3 June 1964
SK Sturm Graz	2–3	Kapfenberger SV

== Semi-finals ==
Team 1	Score	Team 2
16 June 1964
Admira-Energie Wien	3–1	Kapfenberger SV
17 June 1964
SK Rapid Wien	3–3 (a.e.t.)	FK Austria Wien
Replay: 24 June 1964
FK Austria Wien	2–1	SK Rapid Wien

== Final ==
1 July 1964
19:00

Admira-Energie Wien	1–0	FK Austria Wien
Stamm 28'	Report

Praterstadion, Vienna
Attendance: 4,000
Referee: Karl Kainer
