= 1959–60 Austrian Cup =

Tournament details
- Country: Austria

Final positions
- Champions: Austria Wien
- Runners-up: Rapid Wien

The 1959–60 Austrian Cup (German: ÖFB-Cup) was the 26th season of Austria's nationwide football cup competition. The final was held at the Praterstadion, Vienna on 25 June 1960.

The competition was won by Austria Wien after beating Rapid Wien 4–2.

== Preliminary round ==
Team 1	Score	Team 2
12 March 1960
SVS Linz	3–1	WSV ATSV Ranshofen
13 March 1960
1. Oberndorfer SK 1920	3–5	FC Dornbirn
ASK Ternitz	3–2 (a.e.t.)	Kapfenberger SV
ASV Hohenau	3–1	Salzburger AK 1914
ASV Neufeld	6–2	Floridsdorfer AC
ASV Siegendorf	2–1	ÖMV Olympia Stadlau
ASV Wienerberg	4–2	Amateure Steyr
SC Austria Lustenau	1–1 (a.e.t.)^{1}	FC Wacker Innsbruck
FC Wien	3–0	SK Sturm Graz
FS Elektra Wien	2–1	KSV Ankerbrot Wien
Innsbrucker SK	5–0	WSV Eisenerz
SC Eisenstadt	6–1	SV Leoben
SC Ortmann	6–2	1. Schwechater SC
SV Deutschkreutz	2–1	Welser SC
SK Vorwärts Steyr	0–2 (a.e.t.)	WSG Radenthein
23 March 1960
ESV Austria Graz	0–2	VOITH St. Pölten
26 March 1960
WSV Fohnsdorf	1–0	FC ÖMV Stadlau
27 March 1960
SK Austria Klagenfurt	1–4	SC Bruck/Mur

- ^{1} Austria Lustenau decided not to compete in the replay match scheduled for 30 March 1960 in Innsbruck.

== First round ==
Team 1	Score	Team 2
2 April 1960
WSV Fohnsdorf	0–3	FC Wien
5 April 1960
SK Rapid Wien	3–2	1. Simmeringer SC
6 April 1960
ASK Ternitz	3–0	SC Eisenstadt
ASV Neufeld	3–4	Wacker Wien
ASV Siegendorf	1–4	FK Austria Wien
ASV Wienerberg	1–2	First Vienna FC
SV Austria Salzburg	3–1	ASV Hohenau
FC Dornbirn	4–2	Grazer AK
Linzer ASK	4–0	Kremser SC
SC Bruck/Mur	0–2	SVS Linz
VOITH St. Pölten	4–0	SV Deutschkreutz
WSG Radenthein	2–1 (a.e.t.)	Wiener Sport-Club
FC Wacker Innsbruck	0–1	Admira-Energie Wien
Wiener AC	4–1	WSV Donawitz
1. Wiener Neustädter SC	5–3	SC Ortmann
18 April 1960
Innsbrucker SK	2–1	FS Elektra Wien

== Round of 16 ==
Team 1	Score	Team 2
3 May 1960
SK Rapid Wien	2–1	Admira-Energie Wien
4 May 1960
FK Austria Wien	1–0	ASK Ternitz
FC Dornbirn	1–3	Linzer ASK
FC Wien	2–2 (a.e.t.)	SVS Linz
First Vienna FC	4–0	WSG Radenthein
VOITH St. Pölten	2–1	1. Wiener Neustädter SC
Wacker Wien	1–1 (a.e.t.)	Wiener AC
Innsbrucker SK	4–3	SV Austria Salzburg
18 May 1960
SVS Linz	6–2	FC Wien
26 May 1960
Wiener AC	2–0^{1}	Wacker Wien

- ^{1} The original replay played on 17 May was abandoned in the 105th minute by the result 4–3 due to a darkness.

== Quarter-finals ==
Team 1	Score	Team 2
26 May 1960
FK Austria Wien	8–3	VOITH St. Pölten
Linzer ASK	4–5	SVS Linz
1 June 1960
Wiener AC	1–2	SK Rapid Wien
Innsbrucker SK	2–5	First Vienna FC

== Semi-finals ==
Team 1	Score	Team 2
15 June 1960
SK Rapid Wien	4–3	SVS Linz
16 June 1960
FK Austria Wien	3–0	First Vienna FC

== Final ==
25 June 1960
19:00

FK Austria Wien	4–2	SK Rapid Wien
Fiala 43'; Schleger 61', 72'; Nemec 74'	Report	Gießer 35'; Flögel 84'

Praterstadion, Vienna
Attendance: 10,000
Referee: Friedrich Seipelt
