= 1970–71 Austrian Cup =

Tournament details
- Country: Austria

Final positions
- Champions: Austria Wien
- Runner-up: Rapid Wien

The 1970–71 Austrian Cup (German: ÖFB-Cup) was the 37th season of Austria's nationwide football cup competition. The final was held at the Praterstadion, Vienna on 9 June 1971.

The competition was won by Austria Wien after beating Rapid Wien 2–1 after extra time.

== Preliminary round ==
Team 1	Score	Team 2
8 August 1970
Kapfenberger SV	2–1	Floridsdorfer AC
SV Wienerberger	2–3	WSG Radenthein

== First round ==
Team 1	Score	Team 2
8 August 1970
Amateure Steyr	1–5	SK Sturm Graz
SK Austria Klagenfurt	0–6	Linzer ASK
FC Dornbirn	0–3	SK VÖEST Linz
Red Star Knittelfeld	2–1	Admira-Energie Wien
SC Kundl	1–4	First Vienna FC
SV Heid Stockerau	1–2	SK Rapid Wien
Villacher SV	1–2	Grazer AK
Wiener Sport-Club	2–0	SC Austria Lustenau
9 August 1970
1. Halleiner SK	1–2 (a.e.t.)	1. Simmeringer SC
Blau-Weiß Feldkirch	1–3	WSG Wattens
SK Bischofshofen	2–2 (a.e.t.)	FK Austria Wien
SV Rohrbach	1–9	Wacker Wien
Schwarz-Weiß Bregenz	1–3	FC Wacker Innsbruck
15 August 1970
SC Tulln	0–1 (a.e.t.)	Kapfenberger SV
26 September 1970
WSG Radenthein	1–3 (a.e.t.)	SC Eisenstadt
WSV Fohnsdorf	2–3	SV Austria Salzburg
Replay: 14 October 1970
FK Austria Wien	5–0	SK Bischofshofen

== Second round ==
Team 1	Score	Team 2
26 September 1970
Grazer AK	2–1	Kapfenberger SV
27 September 1970
SK VÖEST Linz	7–1	Red Star Knittelfeld
4 October 1970
1. Simmeringer SC	3–3 (a.e.t.)	Wacker Wien
8 December 1970
SV Austria Salzburg	3–1	Linzer ASK
SK Rapid Wien	2–1	SC Eisenstadt
SK Sturm Graz	2–1 (a.e.t.)	Wiener Sport-Club
FC Wacker Innsbruck	0–1 (a.e.t.)	FK Austria Wien
13 December 1970
WSG Wattens	0–0 (a.e.t.)	First Vienna FC
Replay: 1 November 1970
Wacker Wien	1–0	1. Simmeringer SC
Replay: 13 February 1971
First Vienna FC	4–0	WSG Wattens

== Quarter-finals ==
Team 1	Score	Team 2
20 February 1971
SK Sturm Graz	1–0	SV Austria Salzburg
First Vienna FC	2–1	SK VÖEST Linz
Wacker Wien	0–5	SK Rapid Wien
21 February 1971
FK Austria Wien	1–0	Grazer AK

== Semi-finals ==
Team 1	Score	Team 2
21 April 1971
FK Austria Wien	5–1	SK Sturm Graz
SK Rapid Wien	3–1	First Vienna FC

== Final ==
9 June 1971
19:30

FK Austria Wien	2–1 (a.e.t.)	SK Rapid Wien
Riedl 88', 104'	Report	Buzek 74'

Praterstadion, Vienna
Attendance: 20,000
Referee: Ferdinand Marschall
