= Walter Binder =

Austrian footballer

Personal information
- Date of birth: 14 December 1958 (age 67)
- Place of birth: Vienna, Austria
- Height: 1.83 m (6 ft 0 in)
- Position: Midfielder

Senior career*
Years	Team	Apps	(Gls)
1978–1987	FC Admira Wacker Mödling	242	(46)
1987–1988	Sturm Graz	12	(0)
1988–1989	VfB Mödling		
1989–1993	SV Stockerau		
1993–1996	Favoritner AC		
1996–1997	1. SV Wiener Neudorf		
1997–1998	Wiener Sport-Club		

Managerial career
- 1998: Wiener Sport-Club
- 2003: SV Leobendorf
- 2006–2007: SV Schwechat
- * Club domestic league appearances and goals

Walter Binder (born 14 December 1958) is a retired Austrian footballer who played as a midfielder.
