= 1965–66 Austrian Cup =

Tournament details
- Country: Austria

Final positions
- Champions: Admira-Energie Wien
- Runner-up: Rapid Wien

The 1965–66 Austrian Cup (German: ÖFB-Cup) was the 32nd season of Austria's nationwide football cup competition. The final was held at the Praterstadion, Vienna on 8 June 1966.

The competition was won by Admira-Energie Wien after beating Rapid Wien 1–0.

== Round of 32 ==
Team 1	Score	Team 2
7 August 1965
Wiener AC	0–3	First Vienna FC
14 August 1965
ASK Gloggnitz	1–1 (a.e.t.)	Grazer AK
FC Dornbirn	0–6	1. Schwechater SC
FC Wien	4–0	SK Vorwärts Steyr
Post-Admira Linz	1–4	1. Wiener Neustädter SC
SVG Austria Lustenau/Dornbirn	0–0 (a.e.t.)	SV Austria Salzburg
15 August 1965
SC Kufstein	1–2 (a.e.t.)	1. Simmeringer SC
SC Pinkafeld	2–1	SV Wattens
SC Tulln	2–1 (a.e.t.)	Kapfenberger SV
SK Bischofshofen	0–4	Wiener Sport-Club
SV Mattersburg	0–1	Austria Klagenfurt
SVS Linz	0–5	Linzer ASK
SK Sturm Graz	1–3	FC Wacker Innsbruck
Villacher SV	1–10	SK Rapid Wien
WSV Judenburg	0–3	FK Austria Wien
Wacker Wien	0–2	Admira-Energie Wien
Replay: 1 September 1965
SV Austria Salzburg	2–1	SVG Austria Lustenau/Dornbirn
Grazer AK	5–0	ASK Gloggnitz

== Round of 16 ==
Team 1	Score	Team 2
14 September 1965
1. Simmeringer SC	1–0	SC Tulln
Grazer AK	2–4	SK Rapid Wien
15 September 1965
1. Schwechater SC	3–1	1. Wiener Neustädter SC
FC Wien	2–1	FC Wacker Innsbruck
First Vienna FC	0–4	FK Austria Wien
10 October 1965
Wiener Sport-Club	6–2	SC Pinkafeld
12 October 1965
Admira-Energie Wien	1–0	SV Austria Salzburg
13 October 1965
Linzer ASK	5–0	Austria Klagenfurt

== Quarter-finals ==
Team 1	Score	Team 2
8 December 1965
1. Schwechater SC	3–4 (a.e.t.)	SK Rapid Wien
11 December 1965
1. Simmeringer SC	2–1	Wiener Sport-Club
12 December 1965
Admira-Energie Wien	4–0	Linzer ASK
FC Wien	0–3	FK Austria Wien

== Semi-finals ==
Team 1	Score	Team 2
4 May 1966
SK Rapid Wien	3–0	FK Austria Wien
25 May 1966
1. Simmeringer SC	0–1	Admira-Energie Wien

== Final ==
8 June 1966
19:30

Admira-Energie Wien	1–0	SK Rapid Wien
Herzog 76'	Report

Praterstadion, Vienna
Attendance: 17,000
Referee: Franz Mayer
