= 1991–92 Austrian Cup =

Tournament details
- Country: Austria

Final positions
- Champions: Austria Wien
- Runners-up: Admira Wacker

The 1991–92 Austrian Cup (German: ÖFB-Cup) was the 58th season of Austria's nationwide football cup competition. The final was held at the Praterstadion, Vienna on 6 June 1992.

The competition was won by Austria Wien after beating Admira Wacker 1–0.

== Second round ==
Team 1	Score	Team 2
13 August 1991
ASK Baumgarten	0–1	VfB Union Mödling
FC Dornbirn	1–0	WSG Wattens
Grün Weiß Micheldorf	0–7	SK Vorwärts Steyr
SV Braunau	1–2	Grazer AK
14 August 1991
1. SC Wiener Neustadt	1–2	First Vienna FC
ASK Voitsberg	0–1 (a.e.t.)	VSE St. Pölten
Austria Tabak Linz	1–1 (a.e.t.) (2–3 p)	Union Esternberg
Austria XIII Wien	0–6	SK Rapid Wien
Badener AC	2–0	SV Schwechat
Eintracht Favoriten	2–7	Kremser SC
FC Kufstein	0–1	FC Swarovski Tirol
Friesacher AC	0–3	SK Sturm Graz
LUV Graz	2–0	SK Austria Klagenfurt
SV Hall	1–0	SV Ried
SV Horn	1–2	FK Austria Wien
SV Rohrbach	3–3 (a.e.t.) (6–5 p)	SV Stockerau
SV Rum	1–2	SC Rheindorf Altach
15 August 1991
ASK-BSC Bruck/Leitha	1–3	Favoritner AC
ASK Ybbs	2–0	Wiener Sport-Club
ATSV Wolfsberg	0–2 (a.e.t.)	SV Spittal/Drau
SC Austria Lustenau	4–2	FC Salzburg
EPSV Gmünd	11–4 (a.e.t.)	FC ÖMV Stadlau
FC Puch	0–6	SV Austria Salzburg
Rapid Lienz	0–6	FC Stahl Linz
Deutschlandsberger SC	0–1 (a.e.t.)	Donawitzer SV Alpine
SV Gerasdorf	0–2	SR Donaufeld
SV Gols	3–0	Red Star Wien
SV Oberwart	1–3 (a.e.t.)	Admira/Wacker
SVG Bleiburg	0–0 (a.e.t.) (4–3 p)	Linzer ASK
TSV Hartberg	1–1 (a.e.t.) (3–2 p)	SV Flavia Solva
Union Vöcklamarkt	4–3 (a.e.t.)	SK St. Magdalena
VfB Hohenems	1–4	ESV Saalfelden

== Third round ==
Team 1	Score	Team 2
11 October 1991
Badener AC	4–3	Kremser SC
FC Dornbirn	1–0 (a.e.t.)	SC Rheindorf Altach
TSV Hartberg	0–1	SK Vorwärts Steyr
VfB Union Mödling	1–2	VSE St. Pölten
12 October 1991
ASK Ybb	0–5	SR Donaufeld
SC Austria Lustenau	3–2	SV Spittal/Drau
Donawitzer SV Alpine	1–3	SK Sturm Graz
EPSV Gmünd	1–6	FK Austria Wien
ESV Saalfelden	0–1	Grazer AK
LUV Graz	0–1 (a.e.t.)	SV Austria Salzburg
SV Gols	3–4	Admira/Wacker
SV Hall	1–2	FC Swarovski Tirol
SV Rohrbach	0–10	SK Rapid Wien
SVG Bleiburg	0–3	FC Stahl Linz
Union Esternberg	1–3	First Vienna FC
Union Vöcklamarkt	1–2 (a.e.t.)	Favoritner AC

== Fourth round ==
Team 1	Score	Team 2
27 March 1992
Badener AC	0–4	SV Austria Salzburg
FC Dornbirn	0–2	FC Stahl Linz
First Vienna FC	2–3	Grazer AK
28 March 1992
Admira Wacker	3–0	SK Vorwärts Steyr
FK Austria Wien	2–1	VSE St. Pölten
29 March 1992
Favoritner AC	2–0	SK Rapid Wien
SR Donaufeld	0–1	FC Swarovski Tirol
1 April 1992
SC Austria Lustenau	0–2	SK Sturm Graz

== Quarter-finals ==
Team 1	Score	Team 2
17 April 1992
Admira Wacker	2–0	SK Sturm Graz
18 April 1992
FK Austria Wien	6–0	SV Austria Salzburg
Grazer AK	2–1	FC Swarovski Tirol
19 April 1992
Favoritner AC	2–1	FC Stahl Linz

== Semi-finals ==
Team 1	Score	Team 2
5 May 1992
FK Austria Wien	5–1	Grazer AK
6 May 1992
Favoritner AC	1–2	Admira Wacker

== Final ==
6 June 1992
14:30

FK Austria Wien	1–0	Admira Wacker
Ivanauskas 90'	Report

Praterstadion, Vienna
Attendance: 10,000
Referee: Hubert Forstinger
