= 1989–90 Austrian Cup =

Tournament details
- Country: Austria

Final positions
- Champions: Austria Wien
- Runners-up: Rapid Wien

The 1989–90 Austrian Cup (German: ÖFB-Cup) was the 56th season of Austria's nationwide football cup competition. The final was held at the Praterstadion, Vienna on 12 May 1990.

The competition was won by Austria Wien after beating Rapid Wien 3–1.

== Second round ==
| Team 1 | Score | Team 2 |
|---|---|---|
4 August 1989
| Kapfenberger SV | 0–1 | SV Schwechat |
6 August 1989
| Salzburger AK 1914 | 3–0 | SK Mittersill |
7 August 1989
| USK Anif | 0–2 | FC Kufstein |
8 August 1989
| ASK-BSC Bruck/Leitha | 2–3 | Wiener Sport-Club |
| ASK Hirm | 0–7 | Kremser SC |
| ASK Voitsberg | 2–3 | SV Flavia Solva |
| ASK Ybbs | 1–0 | SV Oberwart |
| ASKÖ Steyrermühl | 2–4 | Grazer AK |
| Austria Tabak Linz | 0–4 | Donawitzer SV Alpine |
| FC Koblach | 1–4 | SV Austria Salzburg |
| Favoritner AC | 6–1 | SV Stockerau |
| Floridsdorfer AC | 1–0 | ASV Vösendorf |
| Friesacher AC | 0–4 | Linzer ASK |
| Rapid Lienz | 1–0 | SK Vorwärts Steyr |
| SC Amaliendorf | 1–2 | VSE St Pölten |
| SC Bruck/Mur | 0–4 | FK Austria Wien |
| SC Eisenstadt | 2–1 | TSV Hartberg |
| SC Kundl | 5–0 | SCR Altach |
| SK St. Magdalena | 1–3 | Austria Klagenfurt |
| SR Donaufeld | 2–0 | FKL Wimmer Wien |
| SV Alpine Kindberg | 1–3 | Admira/Wacker |
| SV Axams | 1–9 | SV Spittal/Drau |
| SV Gols | 1–2 | First Vienna FC |
| SV Grieskirchen | 2–5 | Wolfsberger AC |
| SV Neuberg | 0–1 | VfB Union Mödling |
| SV Ried | 0–3 | SK Sturm Graz |
| Union Esternberg | 0–4 | VOEST Linz |
9 August 1989
| FC Salzburg | 2–3 | FC Swarovski Tirol |
| SVG Bleiburg | 2–0 | LUV Graz |
| Wacker/Groß Viktoria | 5–0 | SC Gaswerk/Straßenbahn |
15 August 1989
| VfB Hohenems | 6–2 | WSG Wattens |
19 August 1989
| SC Tulln | 0–2 | SK Rapid Wien |

== Third round ==
| Team 1 | Score | Team 2 |
|---|---|---|
26 October 1989
| FC Kufstein | 2–3 (a.e.t.) | Austria Klagenfurt |
| SAK 1914 | 0–0 (a.e.t.) (1–4 p) | Donawitzer SV Alpine |
29 October 1989
| SC Kundl | 1–2 | SV Austria Salzburg |
31 October 1989
| SC Eisenstadt | 0–3 | VfB Union Mödling |
1 November 1989
| ASK Ybbs | 0–1 | Wiener Sport-Club |
| Favoritner AC | 0–1 | VOEST Linz |
| SV Flavia Solva | 3–0 | Linzer ASK |
| SR Donaufeld | 1–2 | VSE St. Pölten |
| SV Schwechat | 0–6 | Kremser SC |
| SVG Bleiburg | 1–4 | Grazer AK |
| VfB Hohenems | 1–2 (a.e.t.) | SV Spittal/Drau |
| Wolfsberger AC | 1–1 (a.e.t.) (2–4 p) | SK Sturm Graz |
11 November 1989
| Wacker/Groß Viktoria | 1–3 | First Vienna FC |
21 November 1989
| FK Austria Wien | 1–0 | Admira/Wacker |
| Rapid Lienz | 0–4 | FC Swarovski Tirol |
9 December 1989
| Floridsdorfer AC | 0–4 | SK Rapid Wien |

== Fourth round ==
| Team 1 | Score | Team 2 |
|---|---|---|
3 April 1990
| Austria Klagenfurt | 0–3 | Kremser SC |
| Donawitzer SV Alpine | 3–2 (a.e.t.) | SV Flavia Solva |
| FC Swarovski Tirol | 2–1 | VSE St. Pölten |
| Grazer AK | 2–3 (a.e.t.) | SK Rapid Wien |
| SV Spittal/Drau | 1–0 | VOEST Linz |
| SK Sturm Graz | 3–1 | SV Austria Salzburg |
4 April 1990
| FK Austria Wien | 3–0 | VfB Union Mödling |
| First Vienna FC | 1–1 (a.e.t.) (3–0 p) | Wiener Sport-Club |

== Quarter-finals ==
| Team 1 | Score | Team 2 |
|---|---|---|
17 April 1990
| Kremser SC | 0–1 (a.e.t.) | FK Austria Wien |
| SK Rapid Wien | 2–0 | Donawitzer SV Alpine |
| SK Sturm Graz | 0–2 (a.e.t.) | SV Spittal/Drau |
| First Vienna FC | 3–2 | FC Swarovski Tirol |

== Semi-finals ==
| Team 1 | Score | Team 2 |
|---|---|---|
24 April 1990
| FK Austria Wien | 1–0 | First Vienna FC |
| SK Rapid Wien | 3–1 | SV Spittal/Drau |

== Final ==
12 May 1990
16:00

| FK Austria Wien | 3–1 (a.e.t.) | SK Rapid Wien |
|---|---|---|
| Ogris 90+2'; Stöger 107'; Hasenhüttl 113' | Report | Fjørtoft 82' |

Praterstadion, Vienna
Attendance: 16,000
Referee: Roman Steindl
