= 1918–19 Austrian Cup =

Tournament details
- Country: Austria

Final positions
- Champions: Rapid Wien
- Runner-up: Wiener Sport-Club

The 1918–19 Austrian Cup (German: ÖFB-Cup) was the first season of Austria's nationwide football cup competition. The final was held at the WAF-Platz, Vienna on 3 July 1919.

The competition was won by Rapid Wien after beating Wiener Sport-Club 3–0.

== Second preliminary round ==
Team 1	Score	Team 2
27 October 1918
Hakoah Wien	7–2	SC Baumgarten
Bewegung XX	0–0	Sturm 1907 Wien
Meidlinger Sportfreunde	2–1	Landstraßer Amateure Wien
Neulerchenfelder FK	0–0	1. St. Pöltener SC
Ottakringer SC	4–2	Nussdorfer AC
SK Slovan Wien	9–1	Admira Wien
First Vienna FC	6–2	Sturm 1914 Wien
Wiener Bewegungsspieler	0–3	SC Ober St. Veit
1 November 1918
Rot Stern Wien	7–1	Hermania Wien

== Intermediate round ==
Team 1	Score	Team 2
10 November 1918
SC Germania Schwechat	1–3	SC Donaustadt
Hakoah Wien	10–0	Meidlinger Sportfreunde
SK Slovan Wien	5–1	Bewegung XX
First Vienna FC	3–1	Ottakringer SC
Wiener Bewegungsspieler	0–0	1. St. Pöltener SC

== Third round ==
Team 1	Score	Team 2
23 February 1919
1. Simmeringer SC	3–1 (a.e.t.)	SK Slovan Wien
Floridsdorfer AC	11–0	SC Donaustadt
SC Rudolfshügel	5–2	Rot Stern Wien
First Vienna FC	2–1	Wacker Wien
Wiener AC	0–1 (a.e.t.)	Wiener Amateur SV
Wiener Association FC	3–2	Hertha Wien
Wiener Bewegungsspieler	0–11	SK Rapid Wien
Wiener Sport-Club	3–0	SC Hakoah Wien

== Quarter-finals ==
Team 1	Score	Team 2
16 March 1919
1. Simmeringer SC	1–3	Floridsdorfer AC
SK Rapid Wien	2–1	Wiener Association FC
SC Rudolfshügel	1–0	Wiener Amateur SV
6 April 1919
Wiener Sport-Club	4–1	First Vienna FC

== Semi-finals ==
Team 1	Score	Team 2
27 April 1919
SK Rapid Wien	6–2	SC Rudolfshügel
Wiener Sport-Club	1–0	Floridsdorfer AC

== Final ==
7 July 1919
17:30

SK Rapid Wien	3–0	Wiener Sport-Club
Uridil 7', 53'; Kuthan 85'	Report

WAF-Platz, Vienna
Attendance: 12,000
Referee: Hugo Meisl
