= Walter Stamm =

Austrian footballer (1941–2023)

Personal information
- Date of birth: 20 June 1941
- Date of death: 2023 (aged 81–82)
- Position: Defender

Senior career*
Years	Team	Apps	(Gls)
1958–1970	Admira Wien		

International career
1965–1968	Austria	7	(0)
- * Club domestic league appearances and goals

Walter Stamm (20 June 1941 – 2023) was an Austrian footballer who played as a defender for Admira Wien. He made seven appearances for the Austria national team from 1965 to 1968. He won the national title with Admira Wien in 1965–66 and was part of the Austrian team that defeated England 3–2 at Wembley Stadium.

Stamm died in 2023.
