= Franz Pelikan =

Austrian footballer (1925–1994)

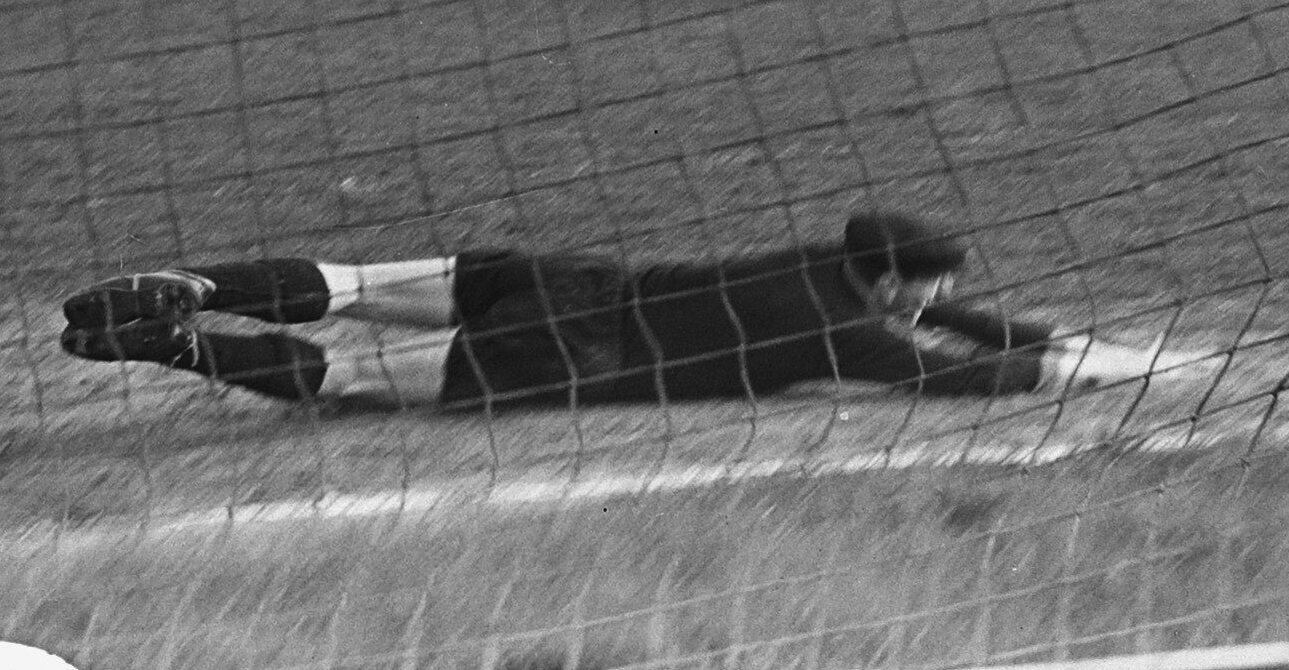
- Pelikan playing for Wacker in 1953

Personal information
- Date of birth: 6 November 1925
- Place of birth: Vienna, Austria
- Date of death: 21 March 1994 (aged 68)
- Position: Goalkeeper

Senior career*
Years	Team	Apps	(Gls)
- Admira Wacker

International career
- Austria
Medal record
Representing Austria
FIFA World Cup
Third place	1954 Switzerland
- * Club domestic league appearances and goals

Franz Pelikan (6 November 1925 – 21 March 1994) was an Austrian football goalkeeper who played for Austria in the 1948 Summer Olympics and 1954 FIFA World Cup. He also played for FC Admira Wacker Mödling.
