= Johann Hörmayer =

Austrian footballer and coach

Personal information
- Date of birth: 25 May 1942
- Place of birth: Austria
- Position: Forward

Senior career*
Years	Team	Apps	(Gls)
1962–1963	FC ÖMV Stadlau		
1963–1973	Wiener Sport-Club	231	(67)
1973–1974	First Vienna FC	22	(3)
1974–1978	Wiener Sport-Club		

International career
1963–1968	Austria	9	(0)

Managerial career
- 1978–1979: SC Untersiebenbrunn
- 1980–1982: SV Schwechat
- 1982–1983: Favoritner AC
- 1988: SV Schwechat
- 1993: Wiener Sport-Club
- 1994–1995: SV Gerasdorf
- * Club domestic league appearances and goals

Johann Hörmayer (born 25 May 1942) is an Austrian football player and coach.
