= 1979–80 Austrian Cup =

Tournament details
- Country: Austria

Final positions
- Champions: Austria Wien
- Runners-up: Austria Salzburg

The 1979–80 Austrian Cup (German: ÖFB-Cup) was the 46th season of Austria's nationwide football cup competition. The final was played over two legs, on 27 May 1980 at the Stadion Lehen, Salzburg and on 10 June 1980 at the Prater Stadion, Vienna.

The competition was won by Austria Wien after beating Austria Salzburg 2–1 on aggregate.

== First round ==
Team 1	Score	Team 2
11 August 1979
1. SC Wiener Neustadt	0–3	SC Eisenstadt
ATSV Timelkam	1–5	Kapfenberger SV
ATUS Bärnbach	1–2	SV St. Veit
Admira Dornbirn	0–1	IG Bregenz/Dornbirn
Badener AC	0–1 (a.e.t.)	SV Schwechat
Deutschlandsberger SC	0–2	Wolfsberger AC
FC Waidhofen/Ybbs	1–3	ASV Kittsee
Magdalener SC	1–6	Villacher SV
Rennweger SV	0–1 (a.e.t.)	SC Neusiedl am See
SC Amateure St. Veit	3–3 (a.e.t.) (4–3 p)	SV Flavia Solva
SK Tamsweg	2–1 (a.e.t.)	IG Dornbirn/Bregenz
SPG Innsbruck	1–2	SSW Innsbruck
SV Heid Stockerau	3–2	1. Simmeringer SC
SV Spittal/Drau	1–3	Austria Klagenfurt
Union Wels	5–0	SV Leithaprodersdorf
SK Vorwärts Steyr	0–0 (a.e.t.) (2–4 p)	Donawitzer SV Alpine
12 August 1979
Dornbirner SV	4–2	FC Götzis
SC Schwaz	0–2	Rapid Lienz
SC Untersiebenbrunn	0–2	Favoritner AC
SV Grödig	0–5	Salzburger AK 1914
SV Hall	2–2 (a.e.t.) (4–2 p)	USK Anif
SV Hannersdorf	1–0	Slovan/HAC

== Second round ==
Team 1	Score	Team 2
18 August 1979
Donawitzer SV Alpine	3–3 (a.e.t.) (3–5 p)	Austria Klagenfurt
Dornbirner SV	4–0	SV Hall
Union Wels	1–0	SC Eisenstadt
Wolfsberger AC	1–0	Villacher SV
19 August 1979
Favoritner AC	0–2 (a.e.t.)	ASV Kittsee
21 August 1979
IG Bregenz/Dornbirn	0–1	Austria Salzburg
SC Amateure St. Veit	1–4	VOEST Linz
22 August 1979
Kapfenberger SV	0–3	SK Sturm Graz
Rapid Lienz	0–1 (a.e.t.)	Salzburger AK 1914
SC Neusiedl am See	1–4	Admira Wacker
SK Tamsweg	2–4	Grazer AK
SSW Innsbruck	2–2 (a.e.t.) (4–1 p)	Linzer ASK
SV Heid Stockerau	1–2	FK Austria Wien
SV Schwechat	1–4	Wiener Sportclub/Post
SV St. Veit	2–2 (a.e.t.) (4–3 p)	First Vienna FC
1 November 1979
SV Hannersdorf	1–7	SK Rapid Wien

== Third round ==
Team 1	Score	Team 2
31 October 1979
Admira Wacker	1–4	FK Austria Wien
Grazer AK	1–3 (a.e.t.)	Austria Klagenfurt
Austria Salzburg	2–1	SK Sturm Graz
Wiener Sportclub/Post	1–0 (a.e.t.)	SSW Innsbruck
1 November 1979
Dornbirner SV	0–1	SV St. Veit
Salzburger AK 1914	0–1	ASV Kittsee
Wolfsberger AC	2–2 (a.e.t.) (3–2 p)	Union Wels
6 November 1979
VOEST Linz	2–1	SK Rapid Wien

== Quarter-finals ==
Team 1	Score	Team 2
7 April 1980
Austria Klagenfurt	1–1 (a.e.t.) (3–5 p)	ASV Kittsee
SV St. Veit	1–1 (a.e.t.) (5–3 p)	Wiener Sport-Club/Post
Wolfsberger AC	0–3	Austria Salzburg
30 April 1980
VOEST Linz	1–3	FK Austria Wien

== Semi-finals ==
Team 1	Score	Team 2
13 May 1980
FK Austria Wien	2–0	ASV Kittsee
Austria Salzburg	2–1	SV St. Veit

== Final ==
=== First leg ===
27 May 1980
18:00

Austria Salzburg	1–0	FK Austria Wien
Weiss 26'	Report

Stadion Lehen, Salzburg
Attendance: 7,500
Referee: Horst Brummeier

=== Second leg ===
10 June 1980
19:00

FK Austria Wien	2–0	Austria Salzburg
Schachner 21' (pen.); Gasselich 71'	Report

Prater Stadion, Vienna
Attendance: 8,000
Referee: Erich Linemayr

Austria Wien won 2–1 on aggregate.
