= Alfons Dirnberger =

Austrian footballer (1941–2022)

Personal information
- Date of birth: 4 September 1941
- Place of birth: Austria, Ostmark, Germany
- Date of death: 18 March 2022 (aged 80)
- Place of death: Austria
- Position: Midfielder

Senior career*
Years	Team	Apps	(Gls)
1957–1958	Sportclub Tulln		
1958–1964	First Vienna FC		
1964–1972	Austria Wien		
1972–1973	SV Admira Wiener Neustadt		

International career
1965–1966	Austria	3	(0)
- * Club domestic league appearances and goals

Alfons Dirnberger (4 September 1941 – 18 March 2022) was an Austrian footballer who played as a midfielder. He made three appearances for the Austria national team from 1965 to 1966.
