= SV Feldkirchen =

Austrian football club

- Full name: SV Feldkirchen/Kärnten
- Founded: 1948; 78 years ago
- Ground: LEOPOLD ARENA, Feldkirchen in Kärnten
- Capacity: 2,500
- Chairman: Walter Moser; Robert Rauter
- Head coach: Robert Pozewaunig
- League: Unterliga East
- 2023–24: Unterliga East, 7th of 16
Home colours	Away colours

Sportverein Feldkirchen/Kärnten, currently called SV M&R Bau Feldkirchen for sponsorship reasons, is an Austrian association football based in Feldkirchen in Kärnten, Carinthia, Austria. The club is affiliated to the Carinthia Football Association and are competing in the Unterliga East, one of the fifth tiers of Austrian football.

== History ==
=== Foundation and growth (1948–1970s) ===
SV Feldkirchen was established on 27 September 1948, through the merger of the Arbeiterturnverein Feldkirchen (ATUS), founded in 1924, and the newly formed Blau-Weiß Feldkirchen. Following the merger, the club adopted the green and white colors and became known as Sportverein Feldkirchen/Kärnten. Alois Schönherr is recognised as the club's founder, with Georg Schurian Sr. serving as its first chairman.

SV Feldkirchen first achieved promotion to the Kärntner Liga in the 1958–59 season, later earning eight Kärntner Liga titles by 2019. Following the 1963–64 season, the team was relegated to the unified Unterliga, with another relegation in 1965–66 moving them to the 1. Klasse East, and then to the 1. Klasse West due to geographical reassignment. In 1968–69, SV Feldkirchen rejoined the Unterliga, which was restructured into "West" and "East" groups.

The club returned to the Kärntner Liga in 1971–72 and, after finishing second in the 1977–78 season, qualified for the 1978–79 Austrian Cup for the first time. They were eliminated in the first round on 6 August 1978, by local second-division team SCA St. Veit after a 1–1 draw and a 5–4 loss in penalties. A second-place finish in 1979–80 secured another Austrian Cup entry, where, on 9 August 1980, they again faced SCA St. Veit, ending with a 3–3 draw and a 4–3 penalty shootout loss.

=== Rise, challenges, and Regionalliga achievements (1980s–2000s) ===
In the 1980–81 season, following a third-place finish, SV Feldkirchen returned to the Austrian Cup and reached the second round for the first time. On 8 August 1981, they won in penalties (4–3) against Austria Klagenfurt after a scoreless draw in extra time, but on 15 August 1981, they were eliminated by ASK Voitsberg in a 1–0 loss. In 1981–82, the team again placed second in the Kärntner Liga but was knocked out in the first Austrian Cup round on 7 August 1982, with a 4–1 loss to Chemie Linz.

After unsuccessful attempts in the 1984, 1987, and 1989 promotion playoffs, SV Feldkirchen achieved promotion to the Regionalliga Mitte in the 1994–95 season under coach Manfred Mertel. However, in 1996–97, they were relegated back to the Kärntner Liga as bottom of the table, followed by a further relegation to the Unterliga in 1997–98.

The club returned to the Kärntner Liga in 2001 and achieved promotion to the Austrian Regionalliga Central in 2004. The 2007–08 season marked a high point for SV Feldkirchen, as they finished second in the Regionalliga Central and reached the Austrian Cup final against SV Horn. (Note: Due to Austria's role as a co-host of UEFA Euro 2008, the Austrian Cup for the 2007–08 season was limited to teams from the Austrian Football First League (second division) and lower. Consequently, Bundesliga teams did not participate, impacting the competition's structure and opening opportunities for lower-division clubs to progress further than usual.) However, in 2008–09, they were relegated to the Kärntner Liga but promptly returned to the Regionalliga Central as champions the following season. In 2010–11, the club was relegated again after placing 14th.

=== Recent years and leadership changes (2010s–2020s) ===
Despite setbacks, player-coach Robert Micheu focused on developing local talent, leading the team to another Kärntner Liga title in 2011–12 and a fourth promotion to the Regionalliga Central. The team, however, was relegated after one season.

From 2013–14, SV Feldkirchen entered a partnership with SV Oberglan, competing in the Kärntner Liga as SV Feldkirchen/SV Oberglan, and achieved a second-place finish that season. The following season, they finished seventh. In 2013, Gerhard Schreilechner, a marketing director from Sparkasse Feldkirchen and a board member of SV Oberglan, took over SV Feldkirchen, which faced financial difficulties.

In late 2023, SV Feldkirchen faced potential dissolution following the resignation of its board amid internal conflicts. Schreilechner initiated efforts to stabilise the club, proposing a broad leadership structure. By January 2024, a new board led by Martin Tamegger was formed, with a focus on youth development and building a competitive team.
