= Austrian Cup =

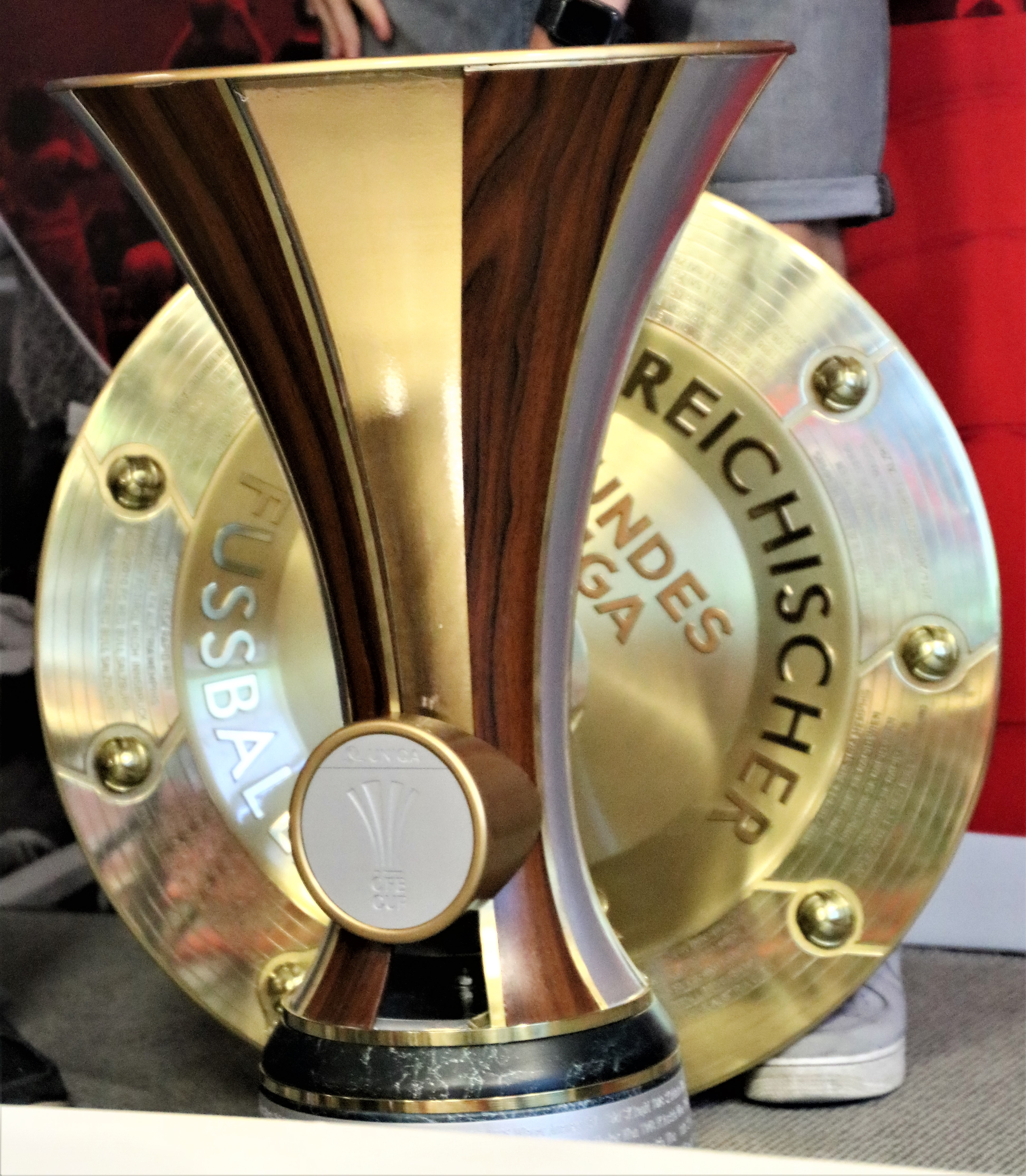
- Austrian Cup trophy since 2019
- Founded: 1918
- Region: Austria
- Teams: 64
- Qualifier for: UEFA Europa League
- Current champions: LASK (2nd title)
- Most championships: Austria Wien (27 titles)
- Broadcaster: ORF
- Motto: Goals for Europe
- Website: http://www.oefb.at/
- 2026–27 Austrian Cup

The Austrian Cup (German: ÖFB-Cup), known as UNIQA ÖFB Cup for sponsorship purposes, is an annual football competition held by the Austrian Football Association, the ÖFB. Austria Wien are the record cup winners, having won for the 27th time in 2008–09. LASK are the current holders, winning their second cup trophy in the 2025–26 edition.

== History ==
It has been held since 1918–19, with the exception of the time of the Anschluss between 1939 and 1945 and the period between 1950 and 1958 when the competition was deemed of little interest. Because Austria co-hosted Euro 2008, only teams from Austrian Football First League (Austrian Second League) or lower divisions took part in the 2007–08 Austrian Cup.

Until 2010, the tournament was named after its main sponsor (the latest being the Austrian brewery Stiegl). Since then, the tournament has been held under the motto "Goals for Europe" ("Tore für Europa") to emphasize that it is the fastest way for Austrian teams to qualify for the UEFA Europa League (6–7 games, depending on the division of the club).

Having won the cup 27 times, Austria Wien is by far the most successful competitor. The current holder of the trophy is Linzer Athletik-Sport-Klub (LASK).

== Austrian Cup Finals ==
Season	Winner	Score	Runner-up
1918–19	Rapid Wien	3–0	Wiener Sport-Club
1919–20	Rapid Wien	5–2	SV Amateure
1920–21	SV Amateure	2–1	Wiener Sport-Club
1921–22	Wiener AF	2–1	SV Amateure
1922–23	Wiener Sport-Club	3–1	SC Wacker Wien
1923–24	SV Amateure	8–6 (a.e.t.)	SK Slovan Wien
1924–25	SV Amateure	3–1	First Vienna FC
1925–26	SV Amateure	4–3	First Vienna FC
1926–27	Rapid Wien	3–0	Austria Wien
1927–28	SK Admira Wien	2–1	Wiener AC
1928–29	First Vienna FC	3–2	Rapid Wien
1929–30	First Vienna FC	1–0	Austria Wien
1930–31	Wiener AC	16 – 15 points (RR)	Austria Wien
1931–32	SK Admira Wien	6–1	Wiener AC
1932–33	Austria Wien	1–0	Brigittenauer AC
1933–34	SK Admira Wien	8–0	Rapid Wien
1934–35	Austria Wien	5–1	Wiener AC
1935–36	Austria Wien	3–0	First Vienna FC
1936–37	First Vienna FC	2–0	Wiener Sport-Club
1937–38	Schwarz-Rot Wien	1–0	Wiener Sport-Club
1938–1945	Austrian clubs took part in DFB-Pokal due to the Anschluss.		
1945–46	Rapid Wien	2–1	First Vienna FC
1946–47	SC Wacker Wien	4–3	Austria Wien
1947–48	Austria Wien	2–0	Sturm Graz
1948–49	Austria Wien	5–2	Vorwärts Steyr
1949–1958	No competition held because of lack of interest and money for the Austrian Football Association.		
1958–59	Wiener AC	2–0	Rapid Wien
1959–60	Austria Wien	4–2	Rapid Wien
1960–61	Rapid Wien	3–1	First Vienna FC
1961–62	Austria Wien	4–1	Grazer AK
1962–63	Austria Wien	1–0	LASK
1963–64	SK Admira Wien	1–0	Austria Wien
1964–65	LASK	1–1 / 1–0	1. Wiener Neustädter SC
1965–66	SK Admira Wien	1–0	Rapid Wien
1966–67	Austria Wien	1–2 / 1–0 (a.e.t.) (c)	LASK
1967–68	Rapid Wien	2–0	Grazer AK
1968–69	Rapid Wien	2–1	Wiener Sport-Club
1969–70	Wacker Innsbruck	1–0	LASK
1970–71	Austria Wien	2–1 (a.e.t.)	Rapid Wien
1971–72	Rapid Wien	1–2 / 3–1	Wiener Sport-Club
1972–73	Wacker Innsbruck	1–0 / 1–2 (a)	Rapid Wien
1973–74	Austria Wien	2–1 / 1–1	Austria Salzburg
1974–75	Wacker Innsbruck	3–0 / 0–2	Sturm Graz
1975–76	Rapid Wien	1–0 / 1–2 (a)	Wacker Innsbruck
1976–77	Austria Wien	1–0 / 3–0	Wiener Sport-Club
1977–78	Wacker Innsbruck	1–1 / 2–1	VÖEST Linz
1978–79	Wacker Innsbruck	1–0 / 1–1	Admira Wacker Wien
1979–80	Austria Wien	0–1 / 2–0	Austria Salzburg
1980–81	Grazer AK	0–1 / 2–0 (a.e.t.)	Austria Salzburg
1981–82	Austria Wien	1–0 / 3–1	Wacker Innsbruck
1982–83	Rapid Wien	3–0 / 5–0	Wacker Innsbruck
1983–84	Rapid Wien	1–3 / 2–0 (a)	Austria Wien
1984–85	Rapid Wien	3–3 (a.e.t.) (6–5 p)	Austria Wien
1985–86	Austria Wien	6–4 (a.e.t.)	Rapid Wien
1986–87	Rapid Wien	2–0 / 2–2	Swarovski Tirol
1987–88	Kremser SC	2–0 / 1–3 (a)	Swarovski Tirol
1988–89	Swarovski Tirol	0–2 / 6–2	Admira Wacker Wien
1989–90	Austria Wien	3–1 (a.e.t.)	Rapid Wien
1990–91	SV Stockerau	2–1	Rapid Wien
1991–92	Austria Wien	1–0	Admira Wacker Wien
1992–93	Wacker Innsbruck	3–1	Rapid Wien
1993–94	Austria Wien	4–0	FC Linz
1994–95	Rapid Wien	1–0	DSV Leoben
1995–96	Sturm Graz	3–1	Admira Wacker Wien
1996–97	Sturm Graz	2–1	First Vienna FC
1997–98	SV Ried	3–1	Sturm Graz
1998–99	Sturm Graz	1–1 (a.e.t.) (4–2 p)	LASK
1999–2000	Grazer AK	2–2 (a.e.t.) (4–3 p)	Austria Salzburg
2000–01	FC Kärnten	2–1 (a.e.t.)	Tirol Innsbruck
2001–02	Grazer AK	3–2	Sturm Graz
2002–03	Austria Wien	3–0	FC Kärnten
2003–04	Grazer AK	3–3 (a.e.t.) (5–4 p)	Austria Wien
2004–05	Austria Wien	3–1	Rapid Wien
2005–06	Austria Wien	3–0	SV Mattersburg
2006–07	Austria Wien	2–1	SV Mattersburg
2007–08 †	SV Horn	2–1	SV Feldkirchen
2008–09	Austria Wien	3–1 (a.e.t.)	Admira Wacker Mödling
2009–10	Sturm Graz	1–0	SC Wiener Neustadt
2010–11	SV Ried	2–0	SC Austria Lustenau
2011–12	Red Bull Salzburg	3–0	SV Ried
2012–13	FC Pasching	1–0	Austria Wien
2013–14	Red Bull Salzburg	4–2	St. Pölten
2014–15	Red Bull Salzburg	2–0 (a.e.t.)	Austria Wien
2015–16	Red Bull Salzburg	5–0	Admira Wacker Mödling
2016–17	Red Bull Salzburg	2–1	Rapid Wien
2017–18	Sturm Graz	1–0 (a.e.t.)	Red Bull Salzburg
2018–19	Red Bull Salzburg	2–0	Rapid Wien
2019–20	Red Bull Salzburg	5–0	SC Austria Lustenau
2020–21	Red Bull Salzburg	3–0	LASK
2021–22	Red Bull Salzburg	3–0	SV Ried
2022–23	Sturm Graz	2–0	Rapid Wien
2023–24	Sturm Graz	2–1	Rapid Wien
2024–25	Wolfsberger AC	1–0	TSV Hartberg
2025–26	LASK	4–2 (a.e.t.)	Rheindorf Altach

Notes:

- † Only teams from Austrian Football First League (Austrian Second League) or lower divisions played due to lack of time because of the Euro 2008 in Austria & Switzerland.

== Performance ==
=== Performance by club ===
Club	Winners	Finalist	Winning Years	Runners-up Years
Austria Wien	27	12	1921, 1924, 1925, 1926, 1933, 1935, 1936, 1948, 1949, 1960, 1962, 1963, 1967, 1971, 1974, 1977, 1980, 1982, 1986, 1990, 1992, 1994, 2003, 2005, 2006, 2007, 2009	1920, 1922, 1927, 1930, 1931, 1947, 1964, 1984, 1985, 2004, 2013, 2015
Rapid Wien	14	16	1919, 1920, 1927, 1946, 1961, 1968, 1969, 1972, 1976, 1983, 1984, 1985, 1987, 1995	1929, 1934, 1959, 1960, 1966, 1971, 1973, 1986, 1990, 1991, 1993, 2005, 2017, 2019, 2023, 2024
Red Bull Salzburg ‡	9	5	2012, 2014, 2015, 2016, 2017, 2019, 2020, 2021, 2022	1974, 1980, 1981, 2000, 2018
Wacker Innsbruck (6) (3); Swarovski Tirol (1) (2); Tirol Innsbruck (–) (1) †	7	6	1970, 1973, 1975, 1978, 1979, 1989, 1993	1976, 1982, 1983, 1987, 1988, 2001
Sturm Graz	7	4	1996, 1997, 1999, 2010, 2018, 2023, 2024	1948, 1975, 1998, 2002
SK Admira Wien (5) (–); SC Wacker Wien (1) (1); Admira Wacker Wien (–) (4); Admira Wacker Mödling (–) (2) *	6	7	1928, 1932, 1934, 1947, 1964, 1966	1923, 1979, 1989, 1992, 1996, 2009, 2016
Grazer AK	4	2	1981, 2000, 2002, 2004	1962, 1968
First Vienna FC	3	6	1929, 1930, 1937	1925, 1926, 1936, 1946, 1961, 1997
Wiener AC	3	3	1931, 1938, 1959	1928, 1932, 1935
LASK	2	5	1965, 2026	1963, 1967, 1970, 1999, 2021
SV Ried	2	2	1998, 2011	2012, 2022
Wiener Sport-Club	1	7	1923	1919, 1921, 1937, 1938, 1969, 1972, 1977
FC Kärnten	1	1	2001	2003
Wiener AF	1	–	1922	–
Kremser SC	1	–	1988	–
SV Stockerau	1	–	1991	–
SV Horn	1	–	2008	–
FC Pasching	1	–	2013	–
Wolfsberger AC	1	–	2025	–
FC Linz	–	2	–	1978, 1994
SV Mattersburg	–	2	–	2006, 2007
SC Austria Lustenau	–	2	–	2011, 2020
SK Slovan Wien	–	1	–	1924
Brigittenauer AC	–	1	–	1933
Vorwärts Steyr	–	1	–	1949
1. Wiener Neustädter SC	–	1	–	1965
DSV Leoben	–	1	–	1995
SV Feldkirchen	–	1	–	2008
SC Wiener Neustadt	–	1	–	2010
St. Pölten	–	1	–	2014
TSV Hartberg	–	1	–	2025
Rheindorf Altach	–	1	–	2026

Notes:

- † All teams are defunct clubs from Innsbruck, Tirol. Wacker Innsbruck (1915–1999), Swarovski Tirol (1986–1992) and Tirol Innsbruck (1993–2002). They are considered to be the continuation of the each other.
- ‡ The Red Bull company bought the club on 6 April 2005 and rebranded it. Prior 2005 the team was known as SV Austria Salzburg or Casino Salzburg. They also changed the colours from white-violet in red-white. The Violet-Whites ultimately formed a new club, SV Austria Salzburg.
- * FC Admira Wacker Mödling was formed after the merger of SK Admira Wien and SC Wacker Wien in 1971, under the name of Admira Wacker Wien, the merge with VfB Mödling in 1997 and the merge with SK Schwadorf in 2008. The new team play in Mödling.

== See also ==
- Austrian Football Bundesliga
- List of Austrian football champions
- Austrian Supercup
