= Ernst Fiala (footballer) =

Austrian footballer

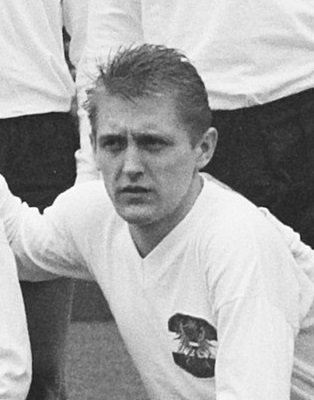
- Fiala (1964)

Personal information
- Date of birth: 23 February 1940
- Place of birth: Vienna, Nazi Germany
- Date of death: 11 November 2006 (aged 66)
- Place of death: Vienna, Austria
- Height: 1.74 m (5 ft 8 1/2 in)
- Position: Forward

Senior career*
Years	Team	Apps	(Gls)
1956–1967	FK Austria Wien	334	(110)

International career
1962–1968	Austria	15	(0)
- * Club domestic league appearances and goals

Ernst Fiala (23 February 1940 – 11 November 2006) was an Austrian football defender who played for Austria. He played for FK Austria Wien.
