= SV Stockerau =

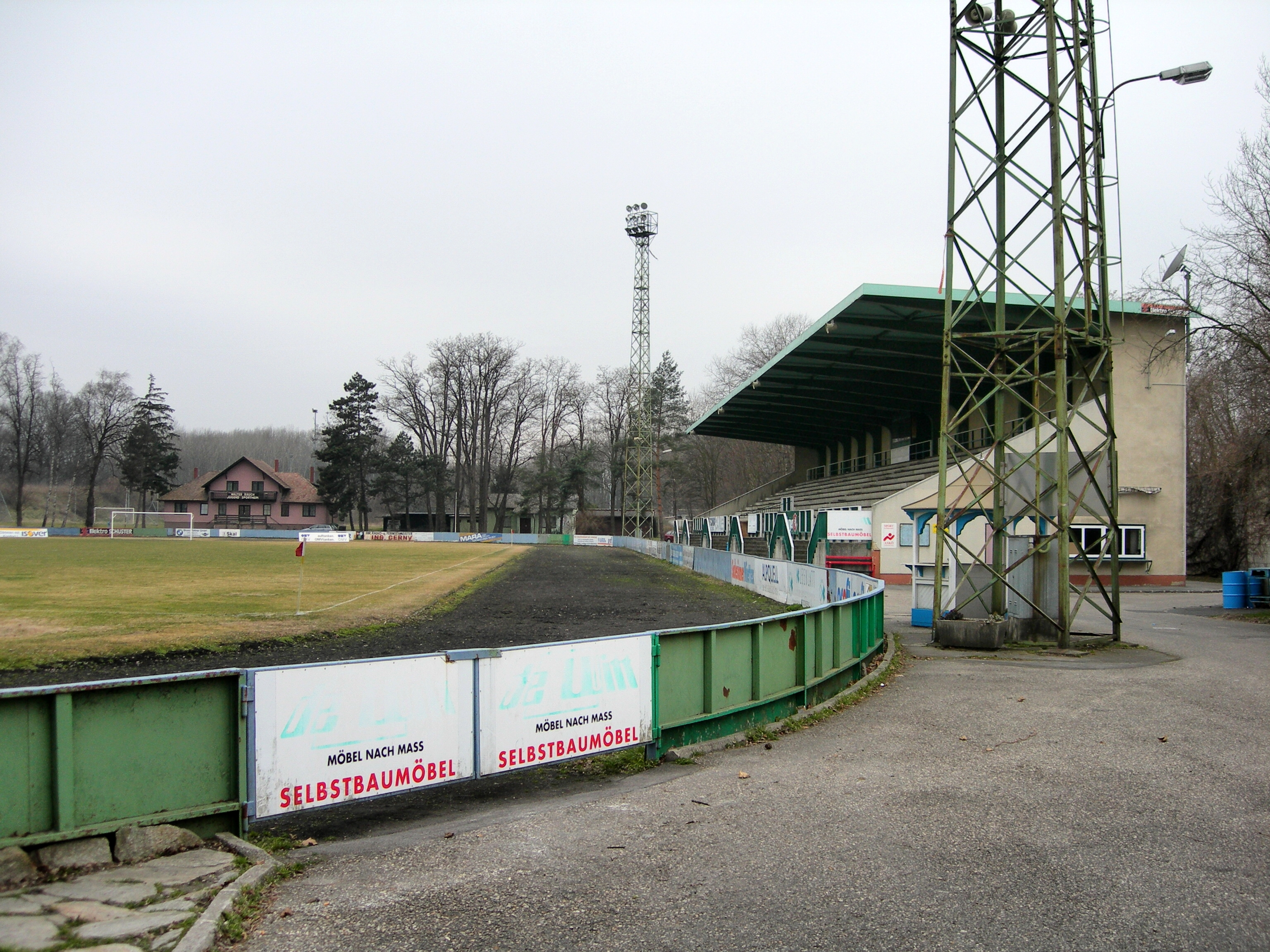
- Full name: Sportverein Stockerau
- Founded: 7 May 1907; 117 years ago
- Ground: Stadion Alte Au, Stockerau
- Capacity: 2,500
- Chairman: Othmar Holzer
- Coach: Kristian Fitzbauer
- League: Austrian 2. Landesliga

SV Stockerau is an Austrian association football club from Stockerau, who currently play in the 5th tier Lower Austria 2. Landesliga Ost.

== History ==
Stockerauer Sportvereinigung 07 was founded on 7 May 1907. They reached the final of the 1913 Lower Austria league championship to play against 1. Wiener Neustädter SC. In summer 1958, the then named ASV TuS Stockerau merged with SV Heid to become SV Heid Stockerau and in 1974 they were renamed SV Telwolle Heid Stockerau.

In 1990 they underwent another namechange, now to SV Sparkasse Stockerau and on 30 May 1991, then 2nd tier Stockerau beat Austrian giants Rapid Vienna in the Austrian Cup final and qualified for the 1991–92 European Cup Winners' Cup. Former Polish international Marek Ostrowski was the most eye-catching player in that cup-winning side.

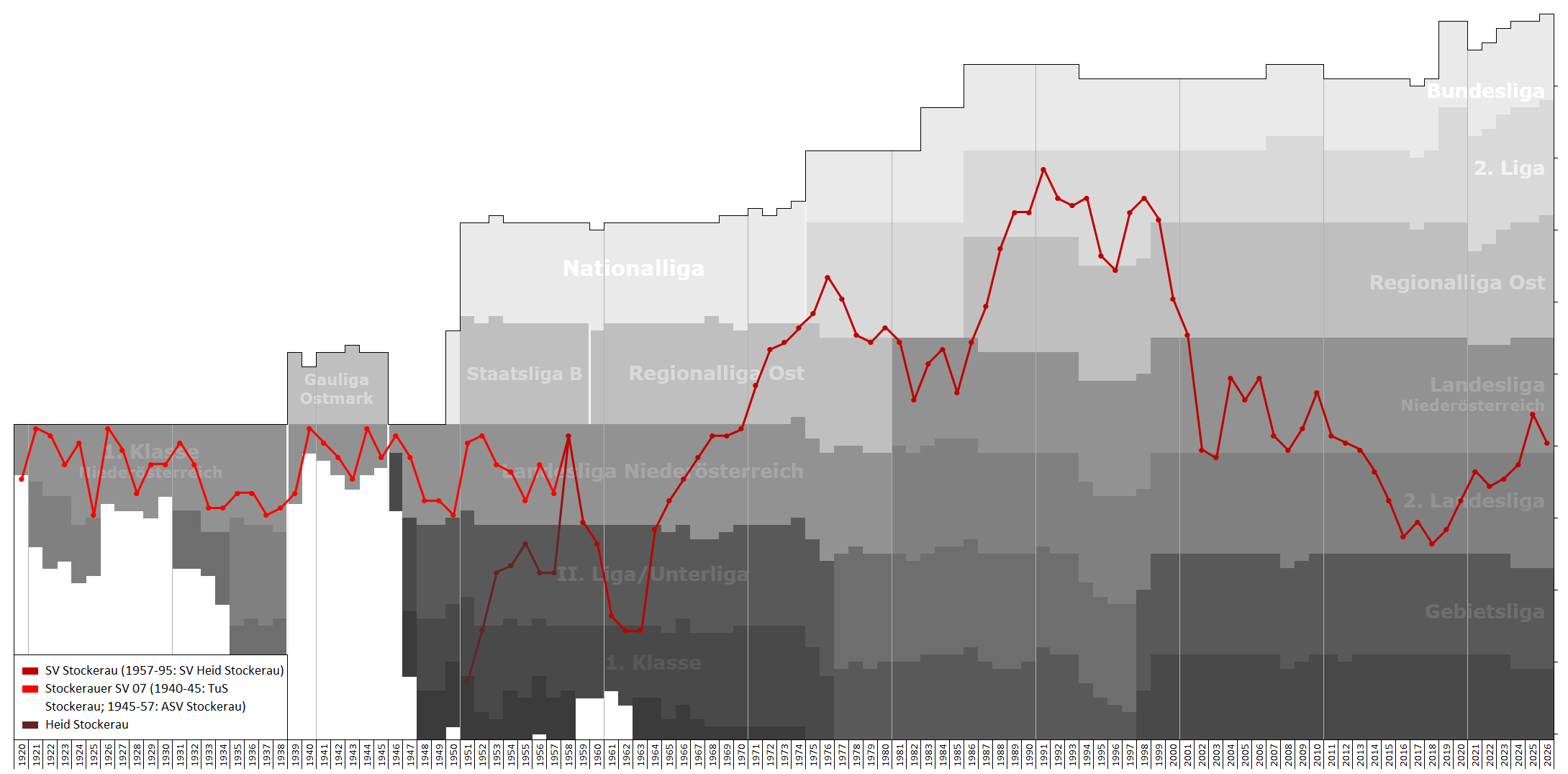
Historical chart of the club's league performance

== European cup history ==
Season	Competition	Round	Country	Club	Home	Away	Aggregate
1991–92	UEFA Cup Winners' Cup	Q	(England)	Tottenham Hotspur	0–1	0–1	0–2
