= SV Schwechat =

Association football club in Austria

- Full name: Sport-Vereinigung Schwechat
- Founded: 1903
- Ground: Rudolf-Tonn-Stadion
- Capacity: 7,000
- Manager: Senad Mujakic
- League: Wiener Stadtliga
- 2018–19: 16th (relegated)
- Website: https://www.svs-fussball.at
Home colours	Away colours

Sport-Vereinigung Schwechat is an Austrian association football club from the capital city of Vienna. They are currently playing in the Wiener Stadtliga and plays their home games at the Rudolf-Tonn-Stadion in Schwechat.

== History ==
=== Founding ===
Sport-Vereinigung Schwechat was founded on August 22, 1903, under the name Allgemeinen-Sportklub-Schwechat (ASK Schwechat).

=== Names ===
- 1903-1907 ASK Schwechat
- 1907-1927 SC Germania Schwechat (merged with SK Graphia Vienna)
- 1927-1934 SK Neukettenhof
- 1934-1945 SC Germania Schwechat (merged with Amateurs XI)
- 1945-1979 1. Schwechat SC (merged with Phoenix Schwechat)
- 1979-pres. SV Schwechat

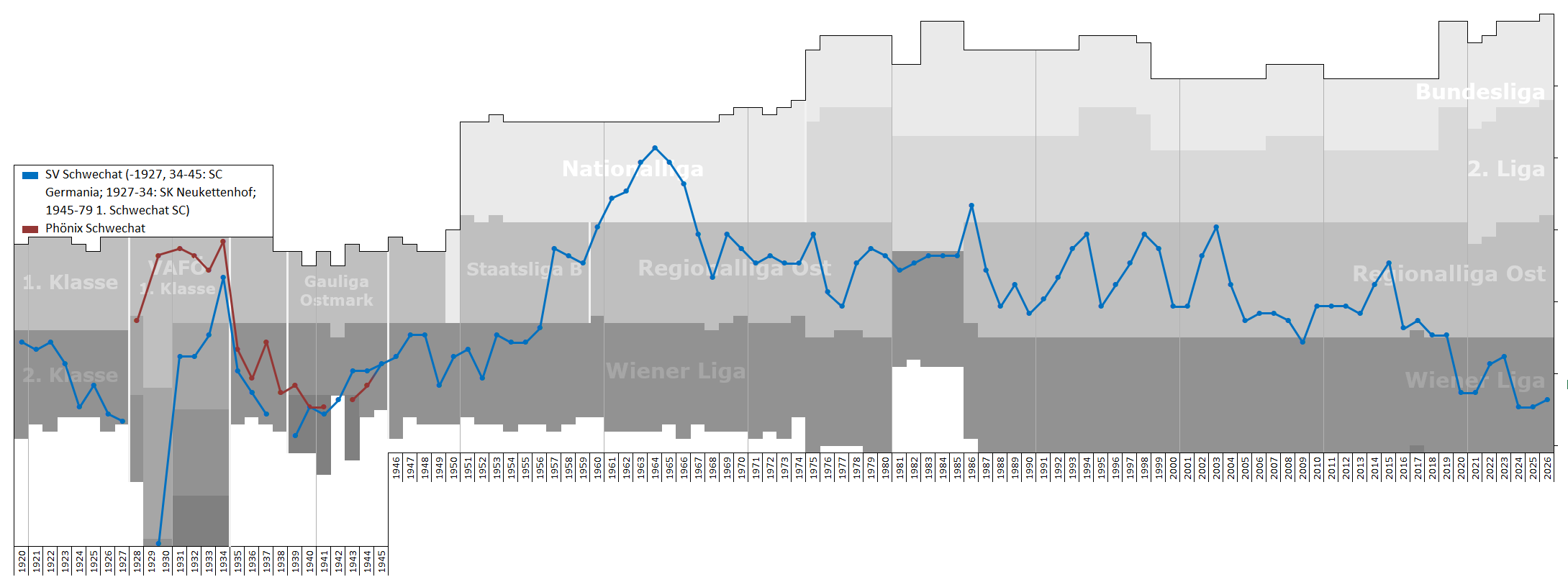
Historical chart of the club's league performance

== Players ==
=== Current squad ===
As of 19 February 2020

Note: Flags indicate national team as defined under FIFA eligibility rules; some limited exceptions apply. Players may hold more than one non-FIFA nationality.

No.	Pos.	Nation	Player
1	GK	AUT	Maximilian Meznik
3	DF	AUT	Marcel Kopriva
3	DF	AUT	Paul Wustinger
5	DF	AUT	Marvin Puschner
6	FW	AUT	Emre Akpinar
7	MF	AUT	Aleksandar Palalic (c)
8	MF	AUT	Niklas Roth
9	FW	AUT	Josip Djoja
14	FW	AUT	Gregor Simandl
17	DF	AUT	Christoph Kafka
19	MF	AUT	Luka Jokanovic
20	MF	CRO	Andre Sliskovic

No.	Pos.	Nation	Player
21	MF	AUT	Emre Kilka
22	MF	AUT	Kilian Chyla
23	DF	AUT	Manuel Freundorfer
25	MF	SVK	Peter Safranek
34	GK	TUR	Haydar Bayram
44	DF	AUT	Eric Auss
54	FW	GER	Daniel Milovanovic
—	MF	AUT	Fatlum Kreka
—	MF	AUT	Emre Yilmaz
91	MF	GRE	Angelos Bountalis
—	MF	TUR	Furkan Ünal
—	GK	AUT	Christoph Gaumannmüll
—	MF	AUT	Osama El Zayat

=== Out on loan ===
Note: Flags indicate national team as defined under FIFA eligibility rules; some limited exceptions apply. Players may hold more than one non-FIFA nationality.

No.	Pos.	Nation	Player

=== Coaching staff ===
Position	Staff
Manager	(Austria) Senad Mujakic
Assistant coach	(Austria) Ronald Maurer
Goalkeeper coach	(Austria) Predrag Kojic
Team Doctor	Dr. Michael Enenkel
Massagist	Lubo Horvath
Physio	Christian Gacesa
Sporting director	Dejan Mladenov

== Coach history ==
Head coach	Nationality	From	Until
Toni Cargnelli	Austria	1 July 1960	30 June 1966
Ferdinand Smetana	Austria	1 July 1966	30 June 1967
Johann Frank	Austria	1 July 1972	30 June 1975
Johann Hörmayer	Austria	1 July 1980	30 June 1982
Johann Frank	Austria	1 July 1985	30 June 1986
Karl Rosner	Austria	1 January 1987	30 June 1987
Johann Hörmayer	Austria	1 January 1988	31 December 1988
Karl Rösner	Austria	1 January 1989	30 June 1990
Karl Ritter	Austria	1 July 1990	30 June 1991
Erich Rausch	Austria	1 July 1991	30 June 1992
Alexander Toth	Austria	17 May 1992	30 June 1994
Friedrich Riedmüller	Austria	1 July 1994	27 September 1994
Christian Janitsch	Austria	28 September 1994	30 June 1995
Günther Wessely	Austria	1 July 1995	19 November 1997
Wolfgang Kienast	Austria	20 November 1997	30 June 1999
Robert Frind	Austria	1 July 1999	30 May 2000
Robert Gehmayer	Austria	1 July 2000	20 September 2000
Karl Rösner	Austria	20 September 2000	24 March 2002
Herbert Onger	Austria	24 March 2002	9 April 2004
Christian Prosenik	Austria	14 April 2004	20 October 2004
Wolfgang Kienast	Austria	20 October 2004	30 June 2006
Reinhard Schendlinger	Austria	1 July 2006	14 August 2006
Walter Binder	Austria	14 August 2006	21 October 2007
Wolfgang Prochaska	Austria	21 October 2007	9 November 2007
Michael Keller	Austria	10 November 2007	30 May 2013
Peter Benes	Austria	1 July 2013	7 November 2016
Markus Bachmayer	Austria	7 November 2016	1 September 2018
Christoph Mandl	Austria	2 September 2018	6 May 2019
Ronald Maurer	Austria	7 May 2019	30 June 2019
Senad Mujakic	Austria	1 July 2019	present

== Past seasons ==
Season	League	Level	Place	Pld	W	D	L	GF	GA	GD	Pts	Austrian Cup	
1960-61	Staatsliga	1	11	26	8	5	13	37	49	-12	21	Quarter finals	
1961-62	Staatsliga	1	10	26	9	5	12	50	68	-18	23	Semi finals	
1962-63	Staatsliga	1	6	26	11	4	11	49	44	+5	26	First round	
1963-64	Staatsliga	1	4	26	13	5	8	51	41	+10	31	First round	
1964-65	Staatsliga	1	6	26	10	9	7	27	28	-1	29	First round	
1965-66	Nationalliga	1	9	26	9	5	12	40	42	-2	23	Quarter finals	
1966-67	Regionalliga Ost	2	2	26	18	3	5	55	28	+27	39	Semi finals	
1967-68	Regionalliga Ost	2	8	28	12	6	10	47	36	+11	30	First round	
1968-69	Regionalliga Ost	2	2	26	16	6	4	61	28	+33	38	Did not enter	
1969-70	Regionalliga Ost	2	4	24	11	5	8	52	38	+14	27	Quarter finals	
1970-71	Regionalliga Ost	2	6	26	12	4	10	49	47	+2	28	Did not enter	
1971-72	Regionalliga Ost	2	5	26	8	13	5	34	30	+2	29	Did not enter	
1972-73	Regionalliga Ost	2	6	26	9	8	9	30	28	+2	26	First round	
1973-74	Regionalliga Ost	2	6	24	9	6	9	45	35	+10	24	Did not enter	
1974-75	Regionalliga Ost	3	2	30	16	6	8	53	40	+13	48	First round	
1975-76	Regionalliga Ost	3	10	30	12	5	13	44	50	-6	29	First round	
1976-77	Regionalliga Ost	3	12	28	9	7	12	32	32	0	25	Did not enter	
1977-78	Regionalliga Ost	3	6	28	11	7	10	47	46	+1	29	Did not enter	
1978-79	Regionalliga Ost	3	4	30	13	7	10	41	41	0	33	Did not enter	
1979-80	Regionalliga Ost	3	5	30	12	13	5	40	25	+15	37	First round	
1980-81	Regionalliga Ost	3	5	30	12	13	5	40	25	+15	37	Did not enter	
1981-82	Regionalliga Ost	3										First round	
1982-83	Regionalliga Ost	3										Second round	
1983-84	Regionalliga Ost	3										Second round	
1984-85	Regionalliga Ost	3										Did not enter	
1985-86	Championship Ö II	2	10	36	10	9	17	48	68	-20	29	First round	
1986-87	Regionalliga Ost	3	7	30	11	7	12	35	39	-4	29	Second round	
1987-88	Regionalliga Ost	3	12	30	9	10	11	44	50	-6	28	Second round	
1988-89	Regionalliga Ost	3	9	30	10	9	11	42	38	+4	29	Did not enter	
1989-90	Regionalliga Ost	3	13	30	9	8	13	39	49	-10	26	Third round	
1990-91	Regionalliga Ost	3	11	30	8	10	12	30	33	-3	26	Second round	
1991-92	Regionalliga Ost	3	8	30	8	12	10	36	38	-2	34	Second round	
1992-93	Regionalliga Ost	3	4	30	13	8	9	40	42	-2	34	Second round	
1993-94	Regionalliga Ost	3	2	30	16	9	5	57	31	+26	41	Third round	
1994-95	Regionalliga Ost	3	12	30	11	6	13	48	59	-11	28	Second round	
1995-96	Regionalliga Ost	3	9	30	11	8	11	34	35	-1	41	Second round	
1996-97	Regionalliga Ost	3	6	30	11	9	10	38	37	+1	42	Did not enter	
1997-98	Regionalliga Ost	3	2	30	16	4	10	50	36	+14	52	Did not enter	
1998-99	Regionalliga Ost	3	4	30	13	5	12	33	39	-6	44	Fourth round	
1999-2000	Regionalliga Ost	3	12	30	7	14	9	22	30	-8	35	Second round	
2000-01	Regionalliga Ost	3	12	30	9	6	15	32	44	-12	33	First round	
2001-02	Regionalliga Ost	3	5	30	13	8	9	43	34	+9	47	Did not enter	
2002-03	Regionalliga Ost	3	1	30	21	6	3	64	23	+41	69	Did not enter	
2003-04	Regionalliga Ost	3	8	30	11	8	11	43	41	+2	41	First round	
2004-05	Regionalliga Ost	3	14	30	5	6	19	24	51	-27	21	Did not enter	
2005-06	Regionalliga Ost	3	13	30	7	10	13	27	38	-11	31	Did not enter	
2006-07	Regionalliga Ost	3	13	30	7	8	15	31	61	-30	29	Preliminary round	
2007-08	Regionalliga Ost	3	14	30	8	8	14	32	47	-15	32	No tournament	
2008-09	Wiener Stadtliga	4	1	30	22	6	2	72	13	+59	72	Did not enter	
2009-10	Regionalliga Ost	3	12	30	9	12	9	36	35	+1	39	First round	
2010-11	Regionalliga Ost	3	13	30	11	6	13	37	48	-1	39	Did not enter	
2011-12	Regionalliga Ost	3	12	30	9	10	11	39	39	0	37	Preliminary round	
2012-13	Regionalliga Ost	3	13	30	7	5	18	42	64	-22	26	Second round	
2013-14	Regionalliga Ost	3	9	30	11	8	11	44	48	-4	41	First round	
2014-15	Regionalliga Ost	3	6	30	12	8	10	44	32	+12	44	First round	
2015-16	Regionalliga Ost	3	15	30	7	5	18	33	64	-31	26	First round	
2016-17	Regionalliga Ost	3	15	28	4	8	16	33	64	-31	20	Did not enter	
2017-18	Regionalliga Ost	3	15	30	5	3	22	25	66	-41	18	Did not enter	
2018-19	Regionalliga Ost	3	16	30	2	4	24	22	80	-58	10	Did not enter	
2019-20	Wiener Stadtliga	4										Did not enter	
Green marks a season followed by promotion.													Red marks a season followed by relegation.
