= 1. Wiener Neustädter SC (1908) =

- Full name: 1. Wiener Neustädter SportClub
- Nickname: blau-weiß
- Short name: WN SC
- Founded: 1908; 118 years ago
- Dissolved: 2010; 16 years ago (merger with FC Magna to form SC Wiener Neustadt)
- Stadium: Stadion Wiener Neustadt, Wiener Neustadt
- Capacity: 10 000
Home colours	Away colours

1. Wiener Neustädter SC was an Austrian association football club. They qualified once for the UEFA Cup Winners' Cup, by reaching the Austrian Cup Final in 1965.

== European cup history ==
Season	Competition	Round	Country	Club	Home	Away	Aggregate
1965–66	UEFA Cup Winners' Cup	1	(Romania)	Ştiinţa Cluj	0–1	0–2	0–3

== Honours ==
- Austrian Cup
  - Finalist (1x): 1964/65
- Austrian Second Division
  - Champions (4x): 1945/46, 1949/50, 1958/59, 1962/63
  - Runners-up (6x): 1937/38, 1938/39, 1941/42, 1946/47, 1973/74, 1975/76
  - Third place (4x): 1947/48, 1951/52, 1955/56, 1976/77
- Austrian Regionalliga East:
  - Champions (1x): 1992/93
  - Runners-up (2x): 1985/86, 1991/92
- Austrian Amateur Championships:
  - Champions (1x): 1935/36
- Lower Austrian Championships:
  - Champions (8x): 1923, 1924, 1925, 1926, 1936, 1937, 1946, 1950
