= Admira Wacker =

Association football club in Austria

- Full name: Fußballclub Admira Wacker
- Nicknames: Admiraner; Südstädter
- Founded: 17 June 1905; 121 years ago
- Ground: Datenpol Arena, Maria Enzersdorf
- Capacity: 10,600
- President: Christian Tschida
- Head coach: Thomas Silberberger
- League: 2. Liga
- 2025–26: 2. Liga, 3rd of 16
- Website: admirawacker.at
Home colours	Away colours

Admira Wacker (German pronunciation: [:atˈmiːʁa ˈvakɐ]) is an Austrian professional football club based in Maria Enzersdorf, a town in the Mödling District of Lower Austria. The team competes in the 2. Liga, the second tier of the Austrian football league system.

The club was formed as Admira/Wacker in 1971 through the merger of SK Admira and SC Wacker, making it the legal successor to both clubs and inheriting their combined titles and achievements. SC Wacker, founded in 1907 in Vienna's Obermeidling district, won the Austrian Championship and Austrian Cup once each. SK Admira, founded in 1905 in the Jedlesee district of Vienna and based in Südstadt since 1967, won eight Austrian Championships, five Austrian Cups, and one Austrian Supercup. Admira's greatest international achievement was reaching the Mitropa Cup final in 1934, while the merged club reached the quarter-finals of the European Cup Winners' Cup in 1990.

== History ==
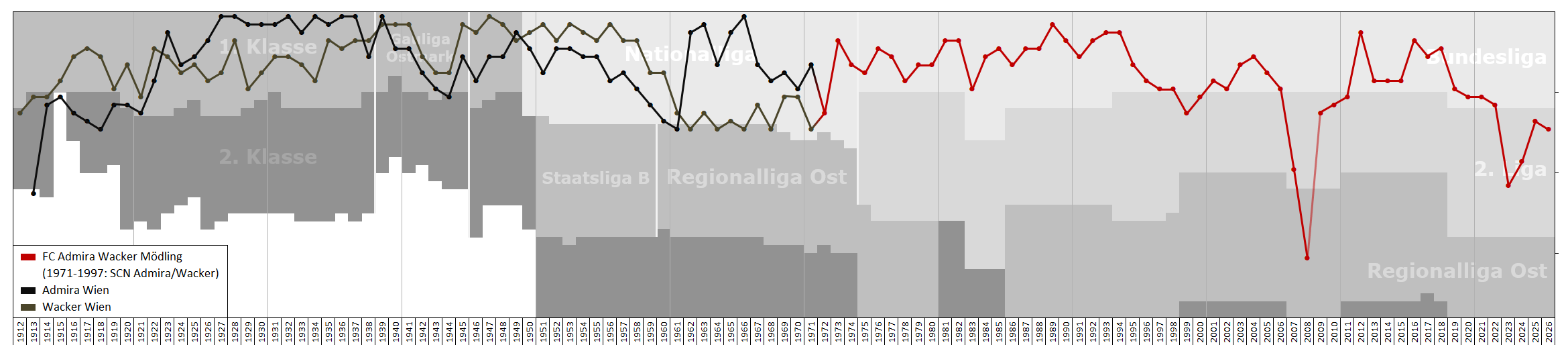
Historical chart of league performance of Admira Wacker and its predecessors

=== SK Admira Vienna ===
SK Admira Vienna was formed in the Vienna district of Jedlesee as a merger between two football clubs named Burschenschaft Einigkeit and Sportklub Vindobona in 1905. In 1919, Admira were promoted to the first tier of the Austrian league system for the first time in their history. The club soon became one of the more successful teams during the inter-war period, capturing seven Austrian national championship and three Austrian Cup titles. Several Admira players were also regulars in the Austria national football team at this time.

After the Anschluss in 1938, Admira played for several seasons in the Gauliga Ostmark, one of the top-flight regional leagues created through the reorganization of German football under the Third Reich. Their win of the 1938–39 Gauliga Ostmark qualified them for the 1939 German football championship, in which Admira made their way to the final against Schalke 04, which was the dominant German football team of the era. They lost overwhelmingly by a score of 0–9. This effort marked the last major success for Vienna before the end of World War II.

=== Post-War ===
The post-war period led to a slow, but steady decline due to lack of funds to buy more competitive players. It eventually culminated into the first brief relegation from the top tier after forty years in 1960. The club underwent two name changes in that period, playing as ESV Admira Vienna after a merger with the railroad sports club ESV Vienna in 1953 before changing to ESV Admira-NÖ Energie Vienna in 1960 due to a sponsorship agreement with regional energy suppliers NEWAG/NIOGAS. Soon thereafter, Admira (or Admira Energie, as it was called in most media during the time) regained some of its earlier strength, winning the Austrian Cup in 1964 and the Double of league and cup titles in 1966.

The revelation of financial scandals within NEWAG/NIOGAS in the late 1960s led to an abrupt end of the steady flow of funds and brought the club onto the brink of administration, which would narrowly be avoided. Nevertheless, Admira began looking for a merger partner, and particularly targeted Austria Vienna. However, after the creation of Admira-Austria was declined twice, Admira eventually began talks with SC Wacker Vienna, which were successfully concluded in 1971.

=== SC Wacker Vienna ===
Wacker Vienna was formed in 1908 in the Vienna district of Meidling. The club reached the first tier of the Austrian league system for the first time in 1914. Being a mid-table side until the second half of the 1930s, Wacker became a top-team in the 1940s and 1950s, winning the double in 1947 and ending as league runners-up eight more times between 1940 and 1956.

During the last decade as an independent club it became a bona-fide yo-yo club, with eight straight relegations from or promotions to the Austrian top tier between 1961 and 1968. A fifth relegation in 1971, combined with financial and stadium problems, eventually led to a merger with Admira, forming FC Admira/Wacker Vienna.

=== VfB Mödling ===
VfB Mödling was formed on 17 June 1911 in the Lower Austrian town of Mödling. Since their foundation, Mödling were playing in the highest Lower Austrian league. With the introduction of an Austria-wide national league in 1949, the club was classified into the second tier. Playing most of its existence in second- and third-tier leagues since then, the club enjoyed three brief stints in the top division during the 1952–53 and 1987–88 seasons as well as between 1992 and 1995 before eventually merging with Admira/Wacker in 1997.

In 1997, after a financial crisis, VfB Mödling and Admira Wacker merged. In 2004 Iranian Majid Pishyar purchased the club. His stewardship of the club led to on-field and off-field difficulties. The club was relegated after the 2005–06 season. With further financial trouble, Pishyar sold the club to Richard Trenkwalder in 2008. Trenkwalder made a series of changes to the club, including changing the club's name to FC Trenkwalder Admira. His changes eventually paid off, with the club gaining promotion back to the Austrian first division following the 2010–11 season.

In 2017, Würzburg-based online printing company Flyeralarm acquired the naming rights for the club, meaning the club will be known as "Flyeralarm Admira" for ten years.

=== Admira Wacker ===
On 1 July 2024, the club officially reverted to its historic name, Admira Wacker, as part of a broader effort to return to its roots. One month earlier, the club had unveiled a newly designed crest, which drew heavily on the 1971 emblem but incorporated modern elements. The decision to reinstate the original club name and update the crest was welcomed by the fan base, particularly by fan clubs that had advocated for this change for many years. The club's traditional colors—black, white, and red—remain unchanged, though black and white have been given renewed emphasis in the club's branding.

== Logos ==
2008–2017

2017–2024

since 2024

== Honours ==
- Austrian Champions: 9
  - Admira Vienna (8): 1926–27, 1927–28, 1931–32, 1933–34, 1935–36, 1936–37, 1938–39, 1965–66
  - Wacker Vienna: 1946–47
- Austrian Cup: 6
  - Admira Vienna (5): 1927–28, 1931–32, 1933–34, 1963–64, 1965–66
  - Wacker Vienna: 1946–47
- Austrian Supercup: 1
  - Admira / Wacker Vienna: 1989
- Mitropa Cup
  - Admira Vienna runner-up: 1934
  - Wacker Vienna runner-up: 1951

== European tournaments history ==
Season	Competition	Round	Club	Home	Away	Aggregate
1964–65	European Cup Winners' Cup	1R	(Poland) Legia Warsaw	1–3	0–1	1–4
1966–67	European Cup	1R	(Socialist Federal Republic of Yugoslavia) Vojvodina	0–1	0–0	0–1
1973–74	UEFA Cup	1R	(Italy) Internazionale	1–0	1–2	2–2
1973–74	UEFA Cup	2R	(Germany) Fortuna Düsseldorf	2–1	0–3	2–4
1982–83	UEFA Cup	1R	(Czechoslovakia) Bohemians Praha	1–2	0–5	1–7
1987–88	UEFA Cup	1R	(Finland) TPS Turku	0–2	1–0	1–2
1989–90	European Cup Winners' Cup	1R	(Cyprus) AEL Limassol	3–0	0–1	3–1
1989–90	European Cup Winners' Cup	2R	(Hungary) Ferencváros	1–0	1–0	2–0
1989–90	European Cup Winners' Cup	QF	(Belgium) Anderlecht	1–1	0–2	1–3
1990–91	UEFA Cup	1R	(Denmark) Velje BK	3–0	1–0	4–0
1990–91	UEFA Cup	2R	(Switzerland) FC Luzern	1–1	1–0	2–1
1990–91	UEFA Cup	3R	(Italy) Bologna	3–0	0–3	3–3 (Note: Admira lost on a penalty shootout 5–6.)
1992–93	European Cup Winners' Cup	1R	(Wales) Cardiff City	2–0	1–1	3–2
1992–93	European Cup Winners' Cup	2R	(Belgium) Royal Antwerp	2–4	4–3 (Note: The tie went to extra time.)	6–7
1993–94	UEFA Cup	1R	(Ukraine) Dnipro Dnipropetrovsk	2–3	0–1	2–4
1994–95	UEFA Cup	1R	(Poland) Górnik Zabrze	5–2	1–1	6–3
1994–95	UEFA Cup	2R	(France) Cannes	1–1	4–2	5–3
1994–95	UEFA Cup	3R	(Italy) Juventus	1–3	1–2	2–5
2012–13	UEFA Europa League	2Q	(Lithuania) Žalgiris Vilnius	5–1	1–1	6–2
2012–13	UEFA Europa League	3Q	(Czech Republic) Sparta Prague	0–2	2–2	2–4
2016–17	UEFA Europa League	1Q	(Slovakia) Spartak Myjava	1–1	3–2	4–3
2016–17	UEFA Europa League	2Q	(Azerbaijan) Kapaz	1–0	2–0	3–0
2016–17	UEFA Europa League	3Q	(Czech Republic) Slovan Liberec	1–2	0–2	1–4
2018–19	UEFA Europa League	2Q	(Bulgaria) CSKA Sofia	1–3	0–3	1–6

== Players ==
=== Current squad ===
As of 23 July 2026

Note: Flags indicate national team as defined under FIFA eligibility rules; some limited exceptions apply. Players may hold more than one non-FIFA nationality.

No.	Pos.	Nation	Player
1	GK	AUT	Clemens Steinbauer
3	DF	AUT	Sergej Savic
4	DF	AUT	Fabian Feiner
5	DF	AUT	Matteo Meisl
—	MF	AUT	Tim Jagersberger
8	MF	TUR	Turgay Gemicibaşi
—	MF	ROU	Denis Lorint
10	FW	AUT	Alexander Schmidt
11	FW	AUT	Justin Forst
—	DF	AUT	Julian Juric
16	MF	AUT	Sandro Steiner
17	MF	AUT	Marco Wagner

No.	Pos.	Nation	Player
—	MF	BIH	Benjamin Dzanovic
19	FW	AUT	Aleksandar Djordjevic
—	GK	AUT	Lukas Limbeck
21	MF	AUT	Nadir Ajanovic
24	DF	AUT	Felix Holzhacker
27	GK	AUT	Jörg Siebenhandl
31	GK	GUI	Sandali Condé
33	DF	AUT	Josef Weberbauer
36	DF	AUT	Aristot Tambwe-Kasengele
68	FW	AUT	Christopher Olsa
—	FW	GHA	Benjamin Nyarko
—	DF	NGR	Emmanuel Michael (loan from LASK)

=== Out on loan ===
Note: Flags indicate national team as defined under FIFA eligibility rules; some limited exceptions apply. Players may hold more than one non-FIFA nationality.

No.	Pos.	Nation	Player
29	DF	AUT	Alexander Leidinger (at FCM Traiskirchen until 30 June 2026)

=== Former players ===
- (Austria) Peter Wurz
- (Romania) Nicolae Lupescu
- (Austria) Marcel Sabitzer

== Coaches ==
- (Austria) Hans Pesser (1 July 1960 – 30 June 1967)
- (Austria) Karl Schlechta (1971)
- (Austria) Ernst Ocwirk (1 July 1971 – 30 June 1973)
- (Austria) Rudolf Matuschka (18 May 1975 – 30 June 1975)
- (Austria) Helmut Senekowitsch (1 July 1975 – 14 May 1976)
- (Austria) Rudolf Matuschka (16 May 1976 – 30 June 1976)
- (Austria) Franz Pelikan (1976)
- (Austria) Rudolf Matuschka (Jan 1977 – June 1977)
- (Poland) Stefan Jasiolek / (Austria) Franz Pelikan (July 1977 – Dec 77)
- (Poland) Antoni Brzeżańczyk (1978)
- (Hungary) Rudolf Illovszky (1 July 1978 – 19 May 1979)
- (Austria) Felix Latzke (23 May 1979 – 30 April 1983)
- (Austria) Ernst Dokupil (5 May 1983 – 16 August 1986)
- (Austria) August Starek (1 July 1986 – 13 March 1988)
- (Austria) Wilhelm Kreuz (14 March 1988 – 30 June 1988)
- (Austria) Ernst Weber (1 July 1988 – 30 June 1990)
- (Austria) Thomas Parits (1 July 1990 – 11 May 1991)
- (Germany) Sigfried Held (11 May 1991 – 30 June 1993)
- (Austria) Dietmar Constantini (1 July 1993 – 31 May 1995)
- (Austria) Walter Knaller (1 July 1995 – 30 June 1996)
- (Austria) Kurt Garger (1 July 1996 – 30 June 1997)
- (Austria) Wolfgang Kienast (1 July 1997 – 30 August 1997)
- (Slovenia) Milan Miklavič (1 September 1997 – 30 June 1998)
- (Austria) Hannes Weninger (1 July 1998 – 22 April 1999)
- (Croatia) Ilija Sormaz (interim) (24 April 1999 – 26 April 1999)
- (Slovenia) Milan Miklavič (26 April 1999 – 26 August 2000)
- (Austria) Hans Krankl (6 September 2000 – 31 December 2001)
- (Austria) Walter Knaller (1 January 2002 – 22 October 2002)
- (Austria) Johann Krejcirik (interim) (25 October 2002 – 9 December 2002)
- (Austria) Alfred Tatar (10 December 2002 – 11 May 2003)
- (Tajikistan) Rashid Rakhimov (10 December 2002 – 11 May 2004)
- (Austria) Bernd Krauss (11 May 2004 – 22 September 2004)
- (Austria) Dominik Thalhammer (23 September 2004 – 16 August 2005)
- (Austria) Robert Pflug (17 August 2005 – 16 February 2006)
- (Austria) Ernst Baumeister (16 February 2006 – 23 December 2007)
- (Austria) Attila Sekerlioglu (23 December 2007 – 18 April 2008)
- (Austria) Ernst Baumeister (2008)
- (Austria) Heinz Peischl (1 July 2008 – 8 August 2008)
- (Austria) Walter Schachner (9 August 2008 – 26 April 2010)
- (Austria) Dietmar Kühbauer (26 April 2010 – 11 June 2013)
- (Austria) Toni Polster (17 June 2013 – 10 August 2013)
- (Austria) Oliver Lederer (10 August 2013 – 19 September 2013)
- (Austria) Walter Knaller (19 September 2013 – 6 April 2015)
- (Austria) Oliver Lederer (6 April 2015 – 30 June 2015)
- (Austria) Ernst Baumeister (1 July 2015 – 30 June 2016)
- (Austria) Oliver Lederer (1 July 2016 – 3 January 2017)
- (Croatia) Damir Burić (3 January 2017 – 9 September 2017)
- (Austria) Ernst Baumeister (9 September 2017 – 28 October 2018)
- (Germany) Reiner Geyer (29 October 2018 – 2 September 2019)
- (Austria) Klaus Schmidt (2 September 2019 – 23 February 2020)
- (Croatia) Zvonimir Soldo (25 February 2020 – 13 September 2020)
- (Germany) Patrick Helmes (interim) (13 September 2020 – 22 September 2020)
- (Croatia) Damir Burić (22 September 2020 – 26 April 2021)
- (Austria) Klaus Schmidt (26 April 2021 – 30 June 2021)
- (Austria) Andi Herzog (1 July 2021 – 30 June 2022)
- (Germany) Roberto Pätzold (1 July 2022 – 5 November 2022)
- (Austria) Rolf Landerl (6 November 2022 – 26 April 2023)
- (England) Tommy Wright (26 April 2023 – 30 June 2023)
- (Austria) Thomas Pratl (1 July 2023 – Present)
