= 1974–75 SK Rapid Wien season =

Rapid Wien
1974-75 season
- Coaches: Ernst Hlozek, Josef Pecanka
- Stadium: Pfarrwiese, Vienna, Austria
- Bundesliga: 3rd
- Cup: Quarter-finals
- UEFA Cup: Second round
- Top goalscorer: League: Hans Krankl (17); All: Hans Krankl (18)
- Average home league attendance: 7,700

The 1974–75 SK Rapid Wien season was the 77th season in club history.

== Squad ==
=== Squad statistics ===
| Nat. | Name | Age | League | | Cup | | UEFA Cup | | Total | | Discipline | |
| Nat. | Name | Age | Apps | Goals | Apps | Goals | Apps | Goals | Apps | Goals | Booked | Sent off (straight red) |
Goalkeepers
| (Austria) | Adolf Antrich | 33 | 2+1 | | | | 1 | | 3+1 | | | |
| (Austria) | Peter Barthold | 20 | 6 | | 1 | | | | 7 | | | |
| (Austria) | Helmut Maurer | 28 | 28+1 | | 2+1 | | 3 | | 33+2 | | | |
Defenders
| (Austria) | Johann Pregesbauer | 16 | 0+1 | | | | | | 0+1 | | | |
| (Austria) | Günter Scheffl | 30 | 9+7 | | | | 0+1 | | 9+8 | | | |
| (Austria) | Gerhard Sturmberger | 34 | 16+5 | | 1+2 | | 1+2 | | 18+9 | | 3 | |
| (Austria) | Alfred Takacs | 26 | 11+5 | | 2 | 1 | 3 | | 16+5 | 1 | 1 | |
| (Austria) | Johann Weiss | 23 | 0+4 | | 0+1 | | | | 0+5 | | | |
| (Austria) | Rainhard Zarbach | 20 | 12+4 | | 1 | | | | 13+4 | | | |
Midfielders
| (Austria) | Norbert Hof | 30 | 34 | 1 | 2 | | 4 | | 40 | 1 | 7 | |
| (Austria) | Egon Pajenk | 23 | 35 | 5 | 3 | 1 | 4 | 1 | 42 | 7 | 5 | |
| (Austria) | Karl Ritter | 27 | 29+3 | 7 | 2 | 1 | 3+1 | 2 | 34+4 | 10 | 2 | |
| (Austria) | Rainer Schlagbauer | 24 | 30+2 | 4 | 3 | 2 | 4 | | 37+2 | 6 | 4 | 1 |
| (Austria) | Werner Walzer | 26 | 36 | 4 | 3 | | 4 | | 43 | 4 | | |
| (Austria) | Oskar Wolf | 26 | 0+1 | | | | 0+1 | | 0+2 | | | |
Forwards
| (Austria) | Manfred Aufgeweckt | 19 | 2+1 | | | | | | 2+1 | | | |
| (Austria) | Ernst Dokupil | 27 | 23+9 | 7 | 2 | | 2+2 | | 27+11 | 7 | 2 | |
| (Austria) | Franz Fegerl | 24 | 1+2 | | 0+1 | | | | 1+3 | | | |
| (West Germany) | Herbert Gronen | 30 | 23+3 | 2 | 2 | | 3 | | 28+3 | 2 | | |
| (Austria) | Hans Krankl | 21 | 33 | 17 | 3 | | 4 | 1 | 40 | 18 | 3 | 1 |
| (West Germany) | Emil Krause | 23 | 36 | 1 | 3 | | 4 | | 43 | 1 | 2 | |
| (Austria) | Paul Pawlek | 17 | 1+2 | | | | | | 1+2 | | | |
| (Austria) | August Starek | 29 | 29+1 | 6 | 3 | 2 | 4 | | 36+1 | 8 | 5 | 1 |

== Fixtures and results ==
Win Draw Loss

=== League ===
| Rd | Date | Venue | Opponent | Res. | Att. | Goals and discipline |
|---|---|---|---|---|---|---|
| 1 | 09.08.1974 | A | LASK | 1-2 | 12,000 | Pajenk 13' |
| 2 | 14.08.1974 | H | LASK | 5-0 | 7,000 | Dokupil 21', Starek 46' 60', Krankl 63', Gronen 78' |
| 3 | 17.08.1974 | A | Austria Salzburg | 0-0 | 9,000 | |
| 4 | 24.08.1974 | H | Austria Salzburg | 5-0 | 9,000 | Kaipel 17' (o.g.), Pajenk 25', Krankl 39' 78', Schlagbauer 65' |
| 5 | 07.09.1974 | A | Sturm Graz | 1-1 | 10,000 | Schlagbauer 38' |
| 6 | 11.09.1974 | H | Sturm Graz | 5-0 | 8,500 | Dokupil 6' 56' (pen.), Schlagbauer 48', Krankl 51', Ritter 90' |
| 7 | 13.09.1974 | A | Austria Wien | 3-1 | 40,000 | Krankl 9' 24' 25' |
| 8 | 21.09.1974 | H | Austria Wien | 2-0 | 27,000 | Ritter 6', Starek 80' |
| 9 | 05.10.1974 | A | Austria Klagenfurt | 1-0 | 5,500 | Krankl 29' |
| 10 | 08.10.1974 | H | Austria Klagenfurt | 2-1 | 3,000 | Starek 5', Pajenk 44' |
| 11 | 19.10.1974 | A | Wacker Innsbruck | 0-2 | 9,500 | |
| 12 | 26.10.1974 | H | Wacker Innsbruck | 1-1 | 7,000 | Ritter 20' |
| 13 | 02.11.1974 | A | VÖEST Linz | 1-2 | 8,000 | Krause 2' |
| 14 | 09.11.1974 | H | VÖEST Linz | 2-1 | 7,500 | Ritter 32', Krankl 40' |
| 15 | 16.11.1974 | A | Admira | 3-0 | 14,000 | Walzer 82' |
| 16 | 27.11.1974 | H | Admira | 0-0 | 5,300 | Krankl (red card) 28' |
| 17 | 30.11.1974 | H | Eisenstadt | 5-1 | 5,000 | Gronen 1', Pajenk 23' 62', Schlagbauer 31', Dokupil 70' (pen.) |
| 18 | 07.12.1974 | A | Eisenstadt | 1-0 | 5,000 | Starek 68' |
| 19 | 22.02.1975 | H | LASK | 0-1 | 6,500 | |
| 20 | 01.03.1975 | A | LASK | 1-1 | 15,500 | Ritter 31' |
| 21 | 08.03.1975 | H | Austria Salzburg | 2-1 | 7,000 | Krankl 76', Hof 90+1' |
| 22 | 19.03.1975 | A | Austria Salzburg | 0-1 | 8,000 | |
| 23 | 22.03.1975 | H | Sturm Graz | 2-1 | 5,500 | Walzer 44', Ritter 86' |
| 24 | 05.04.1975 | A | Sturm Graz | 0-4 | 10,000 | |
| 25 | 12.04.1975 | H | Austria Wien | 1-3 | 12,000 | Krankl 82' (pen.) |
| 26 | 19.04.1975 | A | Austria Wien | 0-1 | 12,000 | |
| 27 | 26.04.1975 | H | Austria Klagenfurt | 1-1 | 5,000 | Starek 75' |
| 28 | 02.05.1975 | A | Austria Klagenfurt | 1-1 | 6,000 | Krankl 8' |
| 29 | 07.05.1975 | H | Wacker Innsbruck | 3-2 | 7,500 | Krankl 15' 20' 23' |
| 30 | 10.05.1975 | A | Wacker Innsbruck | 0-2 | 15,000 | Starek (red card) 44' |
| 31 | 16.05.1975 | H | VÖEST Linz | 0-3 | 8,500 | |
| 32 | 21.05.1975 | A | VÖEST Linz | 1-0 | 7,000 | Krankl 76'; Schlagbauer (red card) 55' |
| 33 | 24.05.1975 | H | Admira | 0-3 | 6,000 | |
| 34 | 30.05.1975 | A | Admira | 1-1 | 7,000 | Ritter 76' |
| 35 | 13.06.1975 | A | Eisenstadt | 3-0 | 2,500 | Dokupil 23' 71', Walzer 47' |
| 36 | 20.06.1975 | H | Eisenstadt | 3-3 | 2,000 | Krankl 20', Dokupil 28', Walzer 55' |

=== Cup ===
| Rd | Date | Venue | Opponent | Res. | Att. | Goals and discipline |
|---|---|---|---|---|---|---|
| R2 | 28.08.1974 | A | Kremser SC | 4-0 | 5,000 | Pajenk 28', Schlagbauer 62' 65', Takacs 83' |
| R16 | 12.10.1974 | H | Admira | 2-1 | 8,500 | Ritter 79', Starek 85' |
| QF | 16.04.1975 | A | VÖEST Linz | 1-2 | 6,000 | Starek 7' |

=== UEFA Cup ===
| Rd | Date | Venue | Opponent | Res. | Att. | Goals and discipline |
|---|---|---|---|---|---|---|
| R1-L1 | 18.09.1974 | H | Aris Saloniki (Greece) | 3-1 | 13,000 | Pajenk 58', Ritter 83', Krankl 90' |
| R1-L2 | 02.10.1974 | A | Aris Saloniki (Greece) | 0-1 | 20,000 | |
| R2-L1 | 23.10.1974 | H | Velež Mostar (Socialist Federal Republic of Yugoslavia) | 1-1 | 6,000 | Ritter 90+2' |
| R2-L2 | 06.11.1974 | A | Velež Mostar (Socialist Federal Republic of Yugoslavia) | 0-1 | 8,000 | |
