= 1975–76 SK Rapid Wien season =

Rapid Wien
1975–76 season
- Coaches: Josef Pecanka, Franz Binder/Robert Körner
- Stadium: Pfarrwiese, Vienna, Austria
- Bundesliga: 3rd
- Cup: Winners (9th title)
- UEFA Cup: First round
- Top goalscorer: League: Hans Krankl (20); All: Hans Krankl (27)
- Average home league attendance: 7,100

The 1975–76 SK Rapid Wien season was the 78th season in club history.

== Squad ==
=== Squad statistics ===
Nat.	Name	Age	League		Cup		UEFA Cup		Total		Discipline	
Nat.	Name	Age	Apps	Goals	Apps	Goals	Apps	Goals	Apps	Goals	Booked	Sent off (straight red)
Goalkeepers
(Austria)	Peter Barthold	21	28		3		2		33			
(Austria)	Karl Ehn	21	0+1						0+1			
(Austria)	Helmut Maurer	29	8		3				11		1	
Defenders
(Austria)	Karl Hift	19			1				1			
(Austria)	Christian Kautzky	17	2						2		1	
(West Germany)	Emil Krause	24	29		4		2		35		1	
(Austria)	Helwig Lintner	18	4		1				5			
(Austria)	Egon Pajenk	24	35	6	6	1	2		43	7	4	
(Austria)	Johann Pregesbauer	17	8+1		3	1			11+1	1		
(Austria)	Rainer Schlagbauer	25	30	1	3+1		2		35+1	1	5	
(Austria)	Gerhard Sturmberger	35	1+10				0+1		1+11		1	
(Austria)	Alfred Takacs	27	1						1			
(Austria)	Rainhard Zarbach	21	5+3		1				6+3			
Midfielders
(Austria)	Stefan Aichorn	21	2+1		1				3+1			
(West Germany)	Herbert Gronen	31	5+3	1			1		6+3	1		
(Austria)	Norbert Hof	31	30		4		2		36		4	
(Austria)	Wolfgang Kienast	18	16+3		2				18+3			
(Austria)	Erich Lisak	18	4	1	2				6	1	1	
(Austria)	Hermann Ollinger	20	2+2						2+2			
(Austria)	Peter Persidis	28	18+2		5	1	1		24+2	1	3	
(Austria)	August Starek	30	30+1	9	5	3	2		37+1	12	4	1
(Austria)	Werner Walzer	27	29+1	1	4+1		2		35+2	1	2	
Forwards
(Austria)	Ernst Dokupil	28	17+5	2	2+2		2		21+7	2	2	1
(Austria)	Rudolf Jellinek	22	6	1	1				7	1		
(Austria)	Hans Krankl	22	35	20	6	6	2	1	43	27	5	
(Austria)	Paul Pawlek	18	14+4	4	4+1	1	0+1		18+6	5		
(Austria)	Walter Pawlek	19	9+1	1	1				10+1	1		
(Austria)	Kurt Widmann	22	28+5	6	4+2	1	2	1	34+7	8		

== Fixtures and results ==
Win Draw Loss

=== League ===
Rd	Date	Venue	Opponent	Res.	Att.	Goals and discipline
1	08.08.1975	A	Admira	1-0	13,000	Krankl 9' (pen.)
2	19.08.1975	H	Admira	2-3	20,000	Jellinek R. 1', Pajenk 55'
3	22.08.1975	A	Austria Salzburg	1-3	5,500	Widmann 67'
4	26.08.1975	H	Austria Salzburg	2-1	10,000	Schwarz 28' (o.g.), Widmann 90'
5	30.08.1975	H	Austria Klagenfurt	3-0	5,000	Pajenk 44', Widmann 61', Gronen 69'
6	06.09.1975	A	Austria Klagenfurt	0-1	4,000	
7	10.09.1975	A	LASK	1-0	10,000	Krankl 35'
8	13.09.1975	H	LASK	4-0	5,500	Krankl 40' 60' 79' (pen.), Starek 49'
9	27.09.1975	H	Austria Wien	1-1	18,000	Widmann 11'
10	04.10.1975	A	Austria Wien	1-1	10,500	Krankl 60' (pen.)
11	08.10.1975	H	Sturm Graz	1-0	2,500	Dokupil 78'
12	17.10.1975	A	Sturm Graz	0-0	4,000	
13	25.10.1975	H	Wacker Innsbruck	1-0	9,000	Widmann 25'
14	31.10.1975	A	Wacker Innsbruck	0-1	12,000	
15	08.11.1975	H	VÖEST Linz	2-0	5,000	Krankl 2' 52'
16	22.11.1975	A	VÖEST Linz	0-0	2,000	
17	29.11.1975	H	GAK	4-3	3,500	Pajenk 3', Widmann 30', Krankl 50' 67'
18	07.12.1975	A	GAK	0-1	5,000	
19	28.02.1976	A	Admira	0-0	9,000	
20	06.03.1976	H	Austria Salzburg	0-1	3,500	
21	13.03.1976	H	Austria Klagenfurt	4-1	2,500	Pawlek W. 8', Starek 17', Pawlek P. 17', Krankl 26'
22	20.03.1976	A	LASK	3-2	7,000	Walzer 13', Starek 18' 74'
23	27.03.1976	H	Austria Wien	4-1	22,000	Krankl 21' 32', Starek 80', Pawlek P. 83'
24	03.04.1976	A	Sturm Graz	0-2	10,000	
25	17.04.1976	H	Wacker Innsbruck	0-4	9,000	
26	21.04.1976	A	VÖEST Linz	1-2	4,000	Krankl 25'
27	24.04.1976	H	GAK	4-3	1,900	Mertel 12' (o.g.), Krankl 32' (pen.), Pawlek P. 58', Starek 72'
28	01.05.1976	H	Admira	2-0	4,000	Pawlek P. 5', Starek 60'
29	07.05.1976	A	Austria Salzburg	1-0	7,000	Schlagbauer 28'
30	14.05.1976	A	Austria Klagenfurt	3-4	2,500	Krankl 18' 77', Pajenk 88'
31	18.05.1976	H	LASK	4-3	2,400	Krankl 1', Pajenk 23' 54', Starek 81'
32	22.05.1976	A	Austria Wien	1-4	11,600	Starek 86'
33	29.05.1976	H	Sturm Graz	2-0	3,000	Krankl 26' 52' (pen.)
34	04.06.1976	A	Wacker Innsbruck	2-2	4,000	Dokupil 13', Lisak 35'
35	16.06.1976	H	VÖEST Linz	0-2	1,700	
36	18.06.1976	A	GAK	0-4	2,000	Starek (red card) 28'

=== Cup ===
Rd	Date	Venue	Opponent	Res.	Att.	Goals and discipline
R2	16.08.1975	A	Rudersdorf	5-1	3,000	Widmann 11', Starek 28' 67', Krankl 84' 87'
R16	09.04.1976	A	Eisenstadt	2-1	2,000	Krankl 77' 85'
QF	04.05.1976	H	Villacher SV	2-1	700	Krankl 49', Persidis 53'
SF	11.05.1976	H	VÖEST Linz	3-1	2,600	Krankl 35', Pajenk 80', Starek 87'
F-L1	02.06.1976	A	Wacker Innsbruck	1-2	8,000	Pregesbauer 82'; Dokupil (red card) 80'
F-L2	08.06.1976	H	Wacker Innsbruck	1-0	15,000	Pawlek P. 89'

=== UEFA Cup ===
Rd	Date	Venue	Opponent	Res.	Att.	Goals and discipline
R1-L1	17.09.1975	H	Galatasaray (Turkey)	1-0	9,000	Widmann 77'
R1-L2	01.10.1975	A	Galatasaray (Turkey)	1-3	60,000	Krankl 61'
