= 1978–79 SK Rapid Wien season =

Rapid Wien
1978–79 season
- Coach: Karl Schlechta
- Stadium: Gerhard-Hanappi-Stadion, Vienna, Austria
- Bundesliga: 3rd
- Cup: Semi-finals
- UEFA Cup: First round
- Top goalscorer: League: Vukan Perovic (11); All: Geza Gallos; Vukan Perovic (11 each)
- Average home league attendance: 6,600

The 1978–79 SK Rapid Wien season was the 81st season in club history.

== Squad ==
=== Squad statistics ===
| Nat. | Name | Age | League | | Cup | | UEFA Cup | | Total | | Discipline | |
| Nat. | Name | Age | Apps | Goals | Apps | Goals | Apps | Goals | Apps | Goals | Booked | Sent off (straight red) |
Goalkeepers
| (Austria) | Peter Barthold | 24 | 13 | | 1 | | | | 14 | | | |
| (Austria) | Herbert Feurer | 24 | 23 | | 3 | | 2 | | 28 | | | |
Defenders
| (Austria) | Reinhard Kienast | 18 | 17+2 | 1 | 1+2 | | 2 | | 20+4 | 1 | 5 | |
| (Austria) | Wolfgang Kienast | 21 | 9+4 | | 2 | | 0+1 | | 11+5 | | 2 | |
| (Austria) | Bernd Krauss | 21 | 22+2 | 3 | 3 | 1 | 1 | | 26+2 | 4 | 4 | |
| (Austria) | Erich Lisak | 21 | 5+1 | | 0+2 | | | | 5+3 | | 1 | |
| (Austria) | Egon Pajenk | 27 | 27 | 1 | 2 | | 2 | | 31 | 1 | 6 | 1 |
| (Austria) | Peter Persidis | 31 | 30+2 | | 4 | | 2 | | 36+2 | | 5 | |
| (Austria) | Johann Pregesbauer | 20 | 31+3 | | 4 | | 2 | | 37+3 | | 3 | |
| (Austria) | Werner Walzer | 30 | 21+4 | 1 | 3 | | 1 | | 25+4 | 1 | | |
| (Austria) | Günther Wessely | 18 | 1+1 | | | | | | 1+1 | | 1 | |
Midfielders
| (Austria) | Günther Happich | 26 | 35 | 6 | 4 | | 2 | | 41 | 6 | 2 | |
| (Austria) | Helmut Kirisits | 24 | 29 | 6 | 3 | 2 | 1 | | 33 | 8 | 8 | 1 |
| (Austria) | Heribert Weber | 23 | 30 | 3 | 4 | 1 | 2 | | 36 | 4 | 6 | |
Forwards
| (Austria) | Wolfgang Augustin | 20 | 1+3 | | | | | | 1+3 | | 2 | |
| (Denmark) | Lars Francker | 26 | 12+9 | 3 | 2+1 | 1 | 2 | 1 | 16+10 | 5 | | |
| (Austria) | Geza Gallos | 29 | 35+1 | 9 | 4 | 2 | 2 | | 41+1 | 11 | 1 | |
| (Austria) | Johann Gröss | 18 | 13+4 | 2 | 1+1 | 2 | | | 14+5 | 4 | 1 | |
| (Austria) | Johann Krejcirik | 26 | 11+9 | 1 | 1 | | 1+1 | 1 | 13+10 | 2 | 3 | |
| (Austria) | Paul Pawlek | 21 | 5+12 | 4 | 0+1 | | 0+2 | | 5+15 | 4 | 1 | |
| (Socialist Federal Republic of Yugoslavia) | Vukan Perovic | 25 | 26+2 | 11 | 2 | | | | 28+2 | 11 | 6 | |

== Fixtures and results ==
Win Draw Loss

=== League ===
| Rd | Date | Venue | Opponent | Res. | Att. | Goals and discipline |
|---|---|---|---|---|---|---|
| 1 | 18.08.1978 | H | Austria Wien | 3-1 | 20,000 | Happich 5' (pen.), Francker 15', Krauss 71' |
| 2 | 25.08.1978 | A | Austria Salzburg | 0-1 | 15,000 | Pajenk (red card) 75' |
| 3 | 02.09.1978 | H | Vienna | 2-1 | 7,800 | Gallos 12', Happich 28' |
| 4 | 09.09.1978 | A | GAK | 1-1 | 8,000 | Kirisits 7' |
| 5 | 15.09.1978 | H | Wacker Innsbruck | 2-0 | 9,000 | Krejcirik 65', Happich 67' (pen.) |
| 6 | 22.09.1978 | H | VÖEST Linz | 0-1 | 6,000 | |
| 7 | 29.09.1978 | A | Admira | 1-0 | 7,000 | Kirisits 76' |
| 8 | 06.10.1978 | H | Wiener SC | 1-0 | 9,700 | Pajenk 64' |
| 9 | 13.10.1978 | A | Sturm Graz | 0-0 | 8,500 | |
| 10 | 22.10.1978 | A | Austria Wien | 1-5 | 22,000 | Kirisits 74' |
| 11 | 28.10.1978 | H | Austria Salzburg | 4-0 | 6,000 | Kirisits 41', Pawlek P. 51' 76', Krauss 58' |
| 12 | 04.11.1978 | A | Vienna | 2-3 | 7,000 | Krauss 33', Gallos 77' |
| 13 | 11.11.1978 | H | GAK | 3-1 | 5,700 | Perovic 5' 12', Francker 47' |
| 14 | 18.11.1978 | A | Wacker Innsbruck | 2-0 | 6,000 | Francker 44', Weber H. 82' |
| 15 | 25.11.1978 | A | VÖEST Linz | 0-0 | 4,500 | |
| 16 | 02.12.1978 | H | Admira | 1-1 | 2,500 | Happich 86' (pen.) |
| 17 | 08.12.1978 | A | Wiener SC | 3-3 | 6,000 | Perovic 6' 61', Gallos 47' |
| 18 | 16.12.1978 | H | Sturm Graz | 3-0 | 3,000 | Happich 15' (pen.), Schilcher 32' (o.g.), Gallos 39' |
| 19 | 24.02.1979 | H | Austria Wien | 1-2 | 13,000 | Happich 70' (pen.) |
| 20 | 03.03.1979 | A | Austria Salzburg | 2-2 | 8,000 | Gröss 36', Gallos 86' |
| 21 | 10.03.1979 | H | Vienna | 0-0 | 5,200 | |
| 22 | 17.03.1979 | A | GAK | 2-2 | 6,000 | Gallos 16' 61' |
| 23 | 24.03.1979 | H | Wacker Innsbruck | 3-0 | 6,000 | Kienast Rei. 37', Kirisits 58', Weber H. 88' |
| 24 | 31.03.1979 | H | VÖEST Linz | 1-1 | 5,500 | Weber H. 22' |
| 25 | 08.04.1979 | A | Admira | 2-1 | 6,000 | Kirisits 64', Perovic 69' |
| 26 | 12.04.1979 | H | Wiener SC | 0-1 | 6,000 | |
| 27 | 20.04.1979 | A | Sturm Graz | 0-0 | 7,000 | |
| 28 | 28.04.1979 | A | Austria Wien | 1-4 | 6,000 | Pawlek P. 67' |
| 29 | 04.05.1979 | H | Austria Salzburg | 2-0 | 2,500 | Perovic 11' 77' |
| 30 | 12.05.1979 | A | Vienna | 1-1 | 10,000 | Perovic 63' |
| 31 | 18.05.1979 | H | GAK | 0-0 | 3,000 | |
| 32 | 26.05.1979 | A | Wacker Innsbruck | 2-4 | 10,000 | Perovic 48', Gallos 74' (pen.); Kirisits (red card) 33' |
| 33 | 01.06.1979 | A | VÖEST Linz | 2-2 | 3,000 | Walzer 36', Gallos 61' |
| 34 | 08.06.1979 | H | Admira | 0-1 | 2,000 | |
| 35 | 15.06.1979 | A | Wiener SC | 0-3 | 8,000 | |
| 36 | 22.06.1979 | H | Sturm Graz | 4-0 | 5,000 | Pawlek P. 58', Perovic 63' 90', Gröss 80' |

=== Cup ===
| Rd | Date | Venue | Opponent | Res. | Att. | Goals and discipline |
|---|---|---|---|---|---|---|
| R2 | 12.08.1978 | A | Simmering | 2-2 (5-4 p) | 5,000 | Mühlhauser 60' (o.g.), Gallos 105' |
| R16 | 26.10.1978 | A | FavAC | 6-0 | 10,300 | Weber H. 4', Francker 17', Kirisits 55' 75', Krauss 76', Gallos 90' |
| QF | 06.03.1979 | A | GAK | 2-1 | 3,000 | Gröss 12' 89' |
| SF | 18.04.1979 | H | Wacker Innsbruck | 0-2 | 5,500 | |

=== UEFA Cup ===
| Rd | Date | Venue | Opponent | Res. | Att. | Goals and discipline |
|---|---|---|---|---|---|---|
| R1-L1 | 13.09.1978 | A | Hajduk Split (Socialist Federal Republic of Yugoslavia) | 0-2 | 25,000 | |
| R1-L2 | 27.09.1978 | H | Hajduk Split (Socialist Federal Republic of Yugoslavia) | 2-1 | 25,000 | Krejcirik 73', Francker 89' |
