= 1976–77 SK Rapid Wien season =

Rapid Wien
1976–77 season
- Coach: Anton Brzezanczyk
- Stadium: Sportklub Stadium; Gerhard-Hanappi-Stadion, Vienna, Austria
- Bundesliga: 2nd
- Cup: Third round
- Cup Winners' Cup: First round
- Top goalscorer: League: Hans Krankl (32); All: Hans Krankl (35)
- Average home league attendance: 6,100

The 1976–77 SK Rapid Wien season was the 79th season in club history.

== Squad ==
=== Squad statistics ===
Nat.	Name	Age	League		Cup		CW Cup		Total		Discipline	
Nat.	Name	Age	Apps	Goals	Apps	Goals	Apps	Goals	Apps	Goals	Booked	Sent off (straight red)
Goalkeepers
(Austria)	Peter Barthold	22	8				1		9			
(Austria)	Herbert Feurer	22	28		2		1		31			
Defenders
(Austria)	Wolfgang Augustin	18	10		1				11		4	
(Austria)	Christian Kautzky	18	27+3		2		2		31+3		1	
(Austria)	Egon Pajenk	25	34	1	2		2		38	1	6	1
(Austria)	Peter Persidis	29	35	2	1		2		38	2	5	
(Austria)	Rainer Schlagbauer	26	19+1	1	1		2		22+1	1	4	
(Austria)	Rainhard Zarbach	22	9+1				2		11+1		1	
Midfielders
(Austria)	Stefan Aichorn	22	1+2						1+2			
(Austria)	Wolfgang Kienast	19	3+2		1				4+2		1	
(Austria)	Helmut Kirisits	22	28+1	11	2		2		32+1	11	2	
(Germany)	Emil Krause	25	36	1	2		2		40	1	2	
(Austria)	Hermann Ollinger	21	8+1		1				9+1			
(Austria)	Johann Pregesbauer	18	18+5		2		2		22+5			
(Austria)	August Starek	31	2+1	1			0+1		2+2	1		
(Austria)	Werner Walzer	28	24		1	1			25	1	1	
Forwards
(Austria)	Rudolf Jellinek	23	1						1			
(Austria)	Hans Krankl	23	35	32	1	2	2	1	38	35	6	
(Austria)	Johann Krejcirik	24	23+12	11	1		0+2	1	24+14	12		
(Austria)	Paul Pawlek	19	16+8	8	0+1				16+9	8		
(Austria)	Heinz Weiss	16	1						1			
(Austria)	Kurt Widmann	23	30+5	3	2		2		34+5	3		

== Fixtures and results ==
Win Draw Loss

=== League ===
Rd	Date	Venue	Opponent	Res.	Att.	Goals and discipline
1	03.08.1976	A	Admira	1-0	15,000	Krejcirik 44'
2	11.08.1976	H	Admira	2-0	5,500	Pawlek P. 65' 66'
3	14.08.1976	A	Austria Wien	2-3	13,500	Pawlek P. 84' 89'
4	20.08.1976	H	Austria Wien	0-1	14,000	
5	28.08.1976	A	Austria Salzburg	2-4	7,000	Krankl 36', Starek 90'
6	01.09.1976	H	Austria Salzburg	2-1	4,500	Krankl 3', Schwarz 72' (o.g.)
7	03.09.1976	A	VÖEST Linz	2-2	3,000	Krankl 64', Kirisits 87'
8	11.09.1976	H	VÖEST Linz	0-0	4,200	
9	05.10.1976	A	Vienna	3-0	6,000	Kirisits 38' 43', Krankl 67'
10	25.09.1976	H	Vienna	0-0	6,000	
11	02.10.1976	H	LASK	4-2	3,000	Krankl 39' (pen.) 70', Persidis 54', Krejcirik 68'
12	09.10.1976	A	LASK	2-2	5,000	Krankl 59' 66'
13	16.10.1976	H	Sturm Graz	1-1	3,000	Widmann 83'
14	23.10.1976	A	Sturm Graz	2-1	5,500	Krankl 16', Kirisits 87'
15	30.10.1976	H	Wacker Innsbruck	0-1	5,000	
16	06.11.1976	A	Wacker Innsbruck	1-1	9,000	Krejcirik 56'
17	13.11.1976	H	GAK	5-3	2,200	Krankl 8' 76' (pen.), Krejcirik 34' 79' 82'
18	20.11.1976	A	GAK	1-0	3,500	Krankl 68'
19	26.02.1977	H	Admira	3-1	6,500	Krankl 1', Kirisits 9', Krejcirik 88'
20	05.03.1977	A	Austria Wien	1-1	13,000	Krankl 60'
21	12.03.1977	H	Austria Salzburg	5-0	5,000	Krankl 13' 21' 76' 89' (pen.), Krejcirik 27'
22	19.03.1977	A	VÖEST Linz	2-1	4,500	Kirisits 29', Krankl 76'
23	23.03.1977	H	Vienna	1-1	9,000	Kirisits 68'
24	26.03.1977	H	LASK	3-0	5,000	Schlagbauer 66', Krankl 83', Krejcirik 89'
25	02.04.1977	A	Sturm Graz	0-0	8,000	
26	06.04.1977	H	Wacker Innsbruck	1-1	12,000	Widmann 17'
27	22.04.1977	A	GAK	0-1	4,000	
28	07.05.1977	A	Admira	2-2	4,000	Pawlek P. 45', Persidis 70'
29	10.05.1977	H	Austria Wien	1-0	14,000	Pawlek P. 84'
30	13.05.1977	A	Austria Salzburg	2-1	2,500	Krankl 18' (pen.), Krejcirik 87'
31	21.05.1977	H	VÖEST Linz	5-4	4,000	Krankl 9' 67', Krause 32', Kirisits 54' 90'
32	27.05.1977	A	Vienna	1-0	6,500	Widmann 1'
33	03.06.1977	A	LASK	1-2	5,500	Krankl 5'
34	10.06.1977	H	Sturm Graz	3-0	3,500	Pawlek P. 7', Krankl 26', Kirisits 70'
35	18.06.1977	A	Wacker Innsbruck	0-1	10,000	
36	22.06.1977	H	GAK	11-1	3,000	Pawlek P. 5', Krankl 6' 24' 58' 59' 61' 76' 87', Kirisits 45', Pajenk 79', Krejcirik 85'

=== Cup ===
Rd	Date	Venue	Opponent	Res.	Att.	Goals and discipline
R2	26.10.1976	A	Kremser SC	2-1	4,000	Krankl 24' 56' (pen.)
R3	03.05.1977	A	Wacker Innsbruck	1-3	8,000	Walzer 85'; Pajenk (red card) 66'

=== Cup Winners' Cup ===
Rd	Date	Venue	Opponent	Res.	Att.	Goals and discipline
R1-L1	15.09.1976	H	Atlético Madrid (Spain)	1-2	50,000	Krankl 19'
R1-L2	29.09.1976	A	Atlético Madrid (Spain)	1-1	45,000	Krejcirik 83'
