= 1977–78 SK Rapid Wien season =

Rapid Wien
1977–78 season
- Coaches: Anton Brzezanczyk, Karl Schlechta
- Stadium: Pfarrwiese; Gerhard-Hanappi-Stadion, Vienna, Austria
- Bundesliga: 2nd
- Cup: Quarter-finals
- UEFA Cup: First round
- Top goalscorer: League: Hans Krankl (41); All: Hans Krankl (42)
- Average home league attendance: 5,700

The 1977–78 SK Rapid Wien season was the 80th season in club history.

== Squad ==
=== Squad statistics ===
Nat.	Name	Age	League		Cup		UEFA Cup		Total		Discipline	
Nat.	Name	Age	Apps	Goals	Apps	Goals	Apps	Goals	Apps	Goals	Booked	Sent off (straight red)
Goalkeepers
(Austria)	Peter Barthold	23	1						1			
(Austria)	Herbert Feurer	23	35		3		2		40			
Defenders
(Austria)	Wolfgang Augustin	19	9+4		0+1		2		11+5			
(Austria)	Christian Kautzky	19	16+5				1		17+5			1
(Austria)	Erich Lisak	20	3+4		0+1				3+5		1	
(Austria)	Egon Pajenk	26	35+1	3	3		2		40+1	3	7	1
(Austria)	Peter Persidis	30	31	1	3		1		35	1	3	
(Austria)	Johann Pregesbauer	19	25+1		2		2		29+1		4	
Midfielders
(Austria)	Geza Gallos	28	21+2	1	1+1		2		24+3	1		
(Austria)	Helmut Kirisits	23	33	2	3		2		38	2	6	
(West Germany)	Emil Krause	26	24	1	2		2		28	1	1	
(Austria)	Armin Kuhnert	19	0+1						0+1			
(Socialist Federal Republic of Yugoslavia)	Trifun Mihailović	29	2+4				0+1		2+5			
(Austria)	Werner Walzer	29	36	2	3		2	1	41	3	2	
(Austria)	Heinz Weiss	17	1+1		2				3+1			
Forwards
(Austria)	Robert Bauerstätter	18	0+2						0+2			
(Austria)	Hans Krankl	24	36	41	3	1	2		41	42	4	1
(Austria)	Bernd Krauss	20	35+1	4	2		2		39+1	4		
(Austria)	Johann Krejcirik	25	31+3	12	3	1	0+1		34+4	13	6	
(Austria)	Paul Pawlek	20	22+3	6	3	1			25+3	7		

== Fixtures and results ==
Win Draw Loss

=== League ===
Rd	Date	Venue	Opponent	Res.	Att.	Goals and discipline
1	09.08.1977	A	VÖEST Linz	1-1	6,000	Krankl 14'
2	13.08.1977	H	LASK	1-0	4,500	Kirisits 32'
3	26.08.1977	A	Sturm Graz	3-1	13,000	Krankl 3' 50', Pajenk 88'
4	30.08.1977	H	GAK	1-1	7,000	Persidis 51'
5	02.09.1977	A	Wiener SC	7-2	10,000	Krankl 10' (pen.) 48' 82', Krauss 38' 54', Walzer 61', Krejcirik 84'
6	06.09.1977	H	Vienna	0-1	9,500	
7	09.09.1977	A	Admira	0-2	7,000	
8	30.09.1977	H	Wacker Innsbruck	0-0	6,500	
9	04.10.1977	A	Austria Wien	2-3	11,500	Krauss 69', Pajenk 86'
10	14.10.1977	H	VÖEST Linz	4-0	3,500	Krejcirik 6', Krankl 48' (pen.) 76' 78'
11	22.10.1977	A	LASK	3-1	4,000	Krankl 46' 65' 68'
12	05.11.1977	H	Sturm Graz	2-2	6,000	Krankl 18', Krause 20'
13	09.11.1977	A	GAK	2-4	3,700	Hohenwarter 75' (o.g.), Krankl 88'
14	12.11.1977	H	Wiener SC	1-2	6,000	Krankl 84'
15	19.11.1977	A	Vienna	0-0	5,000	Kautzky (red card) 43', Krankl (red card) 53'
16	26.11.1977	H	Admira	3-1	2,000	Krankl 17' 48', Krauss 90'
17	03.12.1977	A	Wacker Innsbruck	0-2	5,000	
18	11.12.1977	H	Austria Wien	0-1	5,000	
19	17.12.1977	A	VÖEST Linz	0-2	2,500	
20	14.01.1978	H	LASK	6-0	2,500	Krejcirik 12' 53' 75', Krankl 22' 44' 77' (pen.)
21	22.01.1978	A	Sturm Graz	1-1	3,000	Krejcirik 15'
22	28.01.1978	H	GAK	1-1	2,500	Pawlek P. 35'
23	04.02.1978	A	Wiener SC	1-1	3,500	Pawlek P. 60'
24	11.02.1978	H	Vienna	4-1	2,300	Krankl 35' (pen.) 89', Krejcirik 40', Walzer 47'
25	18.02.1978	A	Admira	5-1	3,000	Pawlek P. 21' 64', Krejcirik 36', Krankl 66' 84'
26	25.02.1978	H	Wacker Innsbruck	3-1	7,000	Kirisits 7', Pawlek P. 78', Krankl 83'
27	05.03.1978	A	Austria Wien	0-3	15,000	Pajenk (red card) 84'
28	11.03.1978	H	VÖEST Linz	2-1	4,000	Krankl 8' 43'
29	18.03.1978	A	LASK	6-0	3,200	Krankl 18' (pen.) 60' 66', Krejcirik 53' 64', Schweinzer 72' (o.g.)
30	25.03.1978	H	Sturm Graz	4-1	6,500	Krejcirik 2', Krankl 23', Gallos 71', Weber 73' (o.g.)
31	31.03.1978	A	GAK	2-1	7,000	Krankl 8' 75'
32	08.04.1978	H	Wiener SC	3-2	9,000	Krankl 11' (pen.) 41', Krejcirik 68'
33	15.04.1978	A	Vienna	1-2	8,000	Krankl 59'
34	22.04.1978	H	Admira	6-0	6,000	Krankl 3' 25' (pen.) 60' (pen.) 77' 83', Pawlek P. 17'
35	29.04.1978	A	Wacker Innsbruck	1-1	10,000	Pajenk 74'
36	06.05.1978	H	Austria Wien	0-0	12,000	

=== Cup ===
Rd	Date	Venue	Opponent	Res.	Att.	Goals and discipline
R2	08.12.1977	A	Stockerau	2-0	2,000	Pawlek P. 23', Krejcirik 73'
R3	26.12.1977	A	Kapfenberg	1-1 (6-5 p)	3,500	Krankl 31'
QF	14.03.1978	A	VÖEST Linz	0-2	3,000	

=== UEFA Cup ===
Rd	Date	Venue	Opponent	Res.	Att.	Goals and discipline
R1-L1	14.09.1977	H	Inter Bratislava (Czechoslovakia)	1-0	10,000	Walzer 64'
R1-L2	28.09.1977	A	Inter Bratislava (Czechoslovakia)	0-3	8,000	
