= 1973–74 SK Rapid Wien season =

Rapid Wien
1973–74 season
- Coach: Ernst Hlozek
- Stadium: Pfarrwiese, Vienna, Austria
- Nationalliga: 3rd
- Cup: Semi-finals
- Cup Winners' Cup: Round of 16
- Top goalscorer: League: Hans Krankl (36); All: Hans Krankl (42)
- Average home league attendance: 8,400

The 1973–74 SK Rapid Wien season was the 76th season in club history.

== Squad ==
=== Squad statistics ===
Nat.	Name	Age	League		Cup		CW Cup		Total		Discipline	
Nat.	Name	Age	Apps	Goals	Apps	Goals	Apps	Goals	Apps	Goals	Booked	Sent off (straight red)
Goalkeepers
(Austria)	Adolf Antrich	32	18+1		4		1		23+1			
(Austria)	Peter Barthold	19	14+1		2		3		19+1			
Defenders
(Austria)	Roman Groll	23	0+1						0+1			
(West Germany)	Emil Krause	22	28+1	1	6		2		36+1	1		
(Poland)	Henryk Latocha	30	8+1		1		4		13+1			
(Austria)	Wolfgang Niessner	18			0+1				0+1			
(Austria)	Egon Pajenk	22	30	1	5		4		39	1		
(Austria)	Günter Scheffl	29	24+2		3+2		2+1		29+5			
(Austria)	Gerhard Sturmberger	33	32		6		4		42			
(Austria)	Herwig Tercek	21	0+3		0+1				0+4			
Midfielders
(Austria)	Norbert Hof	29	32	1	6	1	4		42	2		
(Austria)	Wolfgang Markes	18	1+8						1+8			
(Austria)	Kurt Scherr	27	0+2	1	0+1				0+3	1		
(Austria)	Werner Walzer	25	32	2	6		4		42	2		
Forwards
(Austria)	Manfred Aufgeweckt	18	7+4	1	1+3	2	0+1		8+8	3		
(West Germany)	Herbert Gronen	29	28	8	6	1	3		37	9		
(Austria)	Clemens Kos	20	0+1						0+1			
(Austria)	Hans Krankl	20	32	36	6	5	4	1	42	42		
(Austria)	Günther Leber	19	1+8	1	1+1				2+9	1		
(West Germany)	Bernd Lorenz	25	25	10	4	3	4	1	33	14		
(Austria)	Ernst Pils	20	3+1		1				4+1			
(Austria)	Karl Ritter	26	13+2	2	3+1	3	2+1		18+4	5		
(Austria)	August Starek	28	24	10	5		3		32	10		

== Fixtures and results ==
Win Draw Loss

=== League ===
Rd	Date	Venue	Opponent	Res.	Att.	Goals and discipline
2	22.08.1973	H	Leoben	6-4	9,000	Gronen 13' 87', Krankl 16' 31', Pajenk 30', Hof 70'
3	26.08.1973	A	FC Vorarlberg	1-1	13,000	Krankl 70'
4	31.08.1973	H	Radenthein	0-0	9,000	
5	05.09.1973	A	Simmering	1-1	9,000	Krankl 60'
6	08.09.1973	H	VÖEST Linz	0-2	6,000	
7	15.09.1973	A	Wiener SC	4-2	1,000	Krankl 15' 50' 83', Starek 24' (pen.)
8	22.09.1973	H	Sturm Graz	4-0	20,000	Krankl 47', Gronen 48' 90', Starek 81' (pen.)
9	01.12.1973	A	Austria Wien	1-3	6,000	Lorenz 58'
10	06.10.1973	H	Wacker Innsbruck	0-0	11,000	
11	13.10.1973	A	Eisenstadt	1-1	4,000	Lorenz 52'
12	17.10.1973	H	Vienna	3-0	2,500	Krankl 37' 61', Starek 58'
13	20.10.1973	A	Austria Klagenfurt	3-2	5,000	Starek 10' 26' (pen.), Krankl 81'
14	27.10.1973	H	Admira	4-2	9,000	Krankl 11' 34' 54', Gronen 66'
15	03.11.1973	A	LASK	1-2	8,000	Krankl 74'
16	10.11.1973	H	Austria Salzburg	3-1	4,500	Lorenz 7' 42', Starek 31'
17	16.11.1973	A	GAK	1-1	4,000	Lorenz 50'
19	02.03.1974	A	Leoben	1-1	5,500	Ritter 19'
20	09.03.1974	H	FC Vorarlberg	6-1	2,500	Lorenz 16', Krankl 18' 47' (pen.) 70' 89', Scherr 57'
21	17.03.1974	A	Radenthein	1-0	6,000	Ritter 71'
22	20.03.1974	H	Simmering	2-1	5,500	Krankl 15' (pen.) 48'
23	30.03.1974	A	VÖEST Linz	2-2	8,800	Krankl 57' (pen.), Krause 79'
24	06.04.1974	H	Wiener SC	6-1	7,500	Lorenz 17', Gronen 19', Aufgeweckt 36', Krankl 45' 70' 79'
25	09.04.1974	A	Sturm Graz	0-1	10,000	
26	12.04.1974	H	Austria Wien	4-0	30,000	Krankl 7' 44' 60' 71'
27	20.04.1974	A	Wacker Innsbruck	0-0	12,000	
28	24.04.1974	H	Eisenstadt	4-0	2,500	Krankl 45', Starek 47', Walzer 59', Gronen 83'
29	05.05.1974	A	Vienna	2-1	7,000	Lorenz 9', Walzer 20'
30	11.05.1974	H	Austria Klagenfurt	4-0	5,000	Krankl 21' (pen.) 70', Lorenz 35', Leber 89'
31	16.05.1974	A	Admira	1-0	8,000	Krankl 74'
32	19.05.1974	H	LASK	6-0	8,000	Starek 14' 71', Lorenz 32', Krankl 69' 75' 84'
33	25.05.1974	A	Austria Salzburg	0-3	10,000	
34	01.06.1974	H	GAK	2-0	2,000	Starek 58', Gronen 81'

=== Cup ===
Rd	Date	Venue	Opponent	Res.	Att.	Goals and discipline
R1	02.09.1973	A	Bischofshofen	2-0	2,000	Gronen 9', Krankl 27'
R16	23.02.1974	A	Elektra Wien	2-1	2,000	Lorenz 6', Krankl 58'
QF-L1	06.03.1974	H	Dornbirn	3-0	2,000	Hof 5', Lorenz 63', Krankl 65'
QF-L2	03.04.1974	A	Dornbirn	5-0	3,500	Ritter 22' 77', Krankl 26', Lorenz 63', Aufgeweckt 82'
SF-L1	17.04.1974	H	Austria Wien	2-6	22,000	Krankl 14', Ritter 22'
SF-L2	22.05.1974	A	Austria Wien	1-4	10,000	Aufgeweckt 63'

=== Cup Winners' Cup ===
Rd	Date	Venue	Opponent	Res.	Att.	Goals and discipline
R1-L1	19.09.1973	A	Randers (Denmark)	0-0	11,000	
R1-L2	03.10.1973	H	Randers (Denmark)	2-1	8,000	Krankl 15', Lorenz 56'
R2-L1	24.10.1973	A	Milan (Italy)	0-0	35,000	
R2-L2	07.11.1973	H	Milan (Italy)	0-2	4,000	

=== Friendlies ===
+ Far East Tour

Rd	Date	Venue	Opponent	Res.	Att.	Goals and discipline
1	02.01.1974	A	Hong Kong	3-2	10,000	
2	04.01.1974	A	Beograd (Socialist Federal Republic of Yugoslavia)	0-2	10,000	
3	07.01.1974	A	Indonesia	2-1	15,000	
4	09.01.1974	A	Khmer Republic	4-0	25,000	
