= 1970–71 SK Rapid Wien season =

Rapid Wien
1970–71 season
- Coach: Gerd Springer
- Stadium: Pfarrwiese, Vienna, Austria
- Nationalliga: 3rd
- Cup: Runners-up
- Top goalscorer: League: Johnny Bjerregaard (19); All: Johnny Bjerregaard (23)
- Average home league attendance: 8,300

The 1970–71 SK Rapid Wien season was the 73rd season in club history.

== Squad ==
=== Squad statistics ===
Nat.	Name	Age	League		Cup		Total	
Nat.	Name	Age	Apps	Goals	Apps	Goals	Apps	Goals
Goalkeepers
(Austria)	Erwin Fuchsbichler	18	1+1				1+1	
(Austria)	Gerald Fuchsbichler	26	21		4		25	
(Denmark)	Bent Martin	27	8+1		1		9+1	
Defenders
(Austria)	Erich Fak	25	30		5		35	
(Austria)	Walter Gebhardt	24	15+6		2+1		17+7	
(Austria)	Walter Glechner	31	0+1				0+1	
(West Germany)	Theodor Hoffmann	29	24+1		5		29+1	
(Austria)	Alois Jagodic	24	29+1	7	4+1		33+2	7
(Austria)	Egon Pajenk	19	17+2		2		19+2	
(Austria)	Ewald Ullmann	27	20+2	1	3+1		23+3	1
Midfielders
(Austria)	Rudolf Flögel	30	27+2	12	5	4	32+2	16
(Austria)	Stefan Luczisca	23	2+3				2+3	
(Denmark)	Jens Petersen	28	8+3		3		11+3	
(Austria)	August Starek	25	15+3		1		16+3	
(Austria)	Werner Walzer	22	10+4	2	3		13+4	2
Forwards
(Denmark)	Johnny Bjerregaard	27	30	19	5	4	35	23
(Austria)	Hans Buzek	32	29+1	11	5	4	34+1	15
(Austria)	Toni Fritsch	24	11+1		2		13+1	
(Austria)	Geza Gallos	21	30	11	5	1	35	12
(Austria)	Hannes Hartl	23	0+1				0+1	
(Austria)	Hans Krankl	17	1+3		0+2		1+5	
(Austria)	Gerhard Springer	21	2				2	

== Fixtures and results ==
Win Draw Loss

=== League ===
Rd	Date	Venue	Opponent	Res.	Att.	Goals and discipline
1	15.08.1970	A	Wacker Wien	1-1	4,000	Bjerregaard 68'
2	22.08.1970	H	Sturm Graz	1-0	12,000	Bjerregaard 77' (pen.)
3	26.08.1970	A	LASK	3-1	16,000	Flögel 8', Bjerregaard 35' (pen.), Gallos 87'
4	29.08.1970	H	Simmering	3-1	10,100	Ullmann 28', Bjerregaard 69' (pen.), Jagodic 87'
5	05.09.1970	A	Wattens	1-2	8,000	Bjerregaard 69' (pen.)
6	12.09.1970	H	Wiener SC	3-3	12,000	Bjerregaard 10', Flögel 34', Kovacic 42' (o.g.)
7	20.09.1970	A	SW Bregenz	1-0	5,000	Gallos 10'
8	10.10.1970	H	Austria Salzburg	3-3	11,000	Buzek 26', Flögel 63', Bjerregaard 75' (pen.)
9	17.10.1970	A	Vienna	2-1	12,000	Gallos 31', Bjerregaard 55'
10	11.11.1970	H	GAK	6-0	5,000	Flögel 4' 54', Buzek 26' 70', Bjerregaard 30' 57'
11	07.11.1970	A	VÖEST Linz	1-1	8,000	Bjerregaard 90'
12	14.11.1970	H	Radenthein	4-1	7,000	Jagodic 10', Bjerregaard 30' 85', Gallos 35'
13	21.11.1970	A	Wacker Innsbruck	0-5	12,000	
14	29.11.1970	A	Austria Wien	1-1	12,000	Buzek 26'
15	12.12.1970	H	Admira	2-1	6,500	Gallos 51' 57'
16	27.02.1971	H	Wacker Wien	1-0	5,000	Jagodic 48'
17	06.03.1971	A	Sturm Graz	1-2	6,000	Jagodic 7'
18	14.04.1971	H	LASK	0-1	6,500	
19	20.03.1971	A	Simmering	0-0	8,000	
20	28.03.1971	H	Wattens	1-0	7,300	Eder 30' (o.g.)
21	10.04.1971	A	Wiener SC	5-3	8,000	Flögel 16' 79', Bjerregaard 28' (pen.), Jagodic 36', Buzek 86'
22	17.04.1971	H	SW Bregenz	4-0	4,200	Flögel 19', Walzer 62' 64', Gallos 76'
23	25.04.1971	A	Austria Salzburg	1-3	13,000	Bjerregaard 82'
24	01.05.1971	H	Vienna	2-2	11,000	Flögel 23', Jagodic 25'
25	08.05.1971	A	GAK	2-0	6,000	Buzek 34', Gallos 53'
26	12.05.1971	H	VÖEST Linz	4-0	5,000	Flögel 50' 80', Gallos 69', Bjerregaard 73'
27	16.05.1971	A	Radenthein	1-1	1,200	Flögel 41'
28	05.06.1971	H	Wacker Innsbruck	1-1	13,000	Bjerregaard 86'
29	13.06.1971	H	Austria Wien	4-1	9,000	Jagodic 20', Gallos 70', Buzek 71' 77'
30	20.06.1971	A	Admira	6-1	6,000	Buzek 30' 69' 73', Bjerregaard 32' 80', Gallos 77'

=== Cup ===
Rd	Date	Venue	Opponent	Res.	Att.	Goals and discipline
R1	08.08.1970	A	Stockerau	2-1	5,000	Flögel 62' 85'
R16	08.12.1970	H	Eisenstadt	2-1	4,500	Bjerregaard 26' 85'
QF	20.02.1971	A	Wacker Wien	5-0	5,900	Flögel 38' 63', Bjerregaard 45' (pen.) 77', Buzek 90'
SF	21.04.1971	H	Vienna	3-1	7,500	Buzek 13' 24', Gallos 39'
F	09.06.1971	N	Austria Wien	1-2	20,000	Buzek 74'
