= 1978–79 Austrian Cup =

Tournament details
- Country: Austria

Final positions
- Champions: SSW Innsbruck
- Runners-up: Admira/Wacker

The 1978–79 Austrian Cup (German: ÖFB-Cup) was the 45th season of Austria's nationwide football cup competition. The final was played over two legs, on 6 June 1979 at the Tivoli, Innsbruck and on 20 June 1979 at the Bundesstadion Südstadt, Maria Enzersdorf.

The competition was won by SSW Innsbruck after beating Admira/Wacker 2–1 on aggregate.

== First round ==
Team 1	Score	Team 2
4 August 1978
SC Magdalen	2–1	Kapfenberger SV
5 August 1978
Red Star Knittelfeld	1–2	Donawitzer SV Alpine
SC Tamsweg	1–2	Villacher SV
SV Flavia Solva	1–2	SK Austria Klagenfurt
SV Güssing	1–5	SC Eisenstadt
USV Rudersdorf	0–2	Favoritner AC
WSK Kaprun	1–4	Schwarz-Weiß Bregenz
ATUS Bärnbach	1–0	Linzer ASK
Vorwärts Steyr	2–1	SV Heid Stockerau
1. Wiener Neustädter SC	2–0 (a.e.t.)	ASV Kittsee
SV Absam	0–2	USK Anif
Union Wels	1–2	Wolfsberger AC
WSG Wattens	0–2	FC Dornbirn
1. Brigittenauer SC	1–3	Kremser SC
Rennweger SV	4–0	SC Tulln
Blau-Weiß Feldkirch	3–0	SC Austria Lustenau
6 August 1978
FC Höchst	4–4 (a.e.t.) (3–4 p)	ASK Salzburg
SC Laa an der Thaya	2–3 (a.e.t.)	SC Neusiedl am See
SK Amateure Steyr	3–1	SV St. Veit
Badener AC	0–2	1. Simmeringer SC
SV Feldkirchen	1–1 (a.e.t.) (4–5 p)	SC Amateure St. Veit
SV Jenbach	4–1	Salzburger AK 1914

== Second round ==
Team 1	Score	Team 2
12 September 1978
ATUS Bärnbach	2–3	Grazer AK
Donawitzer SV Alpine	6–0	Villacher SV
USK Anif	0–4	Schwarz-Weiß Bregenz
1. Simmeringer SC	2–2 (a.e.t.) (4–5 p)	SK Rapid Wien
FC Dornbirn	0–3	SV Austria Salzburg
SC Neusiedl am See	0–3	1. Wiener Neustädter SC
SV Jenbach	2–1 (a.e.t.)	Blau-Weiß Feldkirch
SK Amateure Steyr	1–2	SK VOEST Linz
Rennweger SV	0–3	First Vienna FC
Kremser SC	3–3 (a.e.t.) (4–3 p)	Wiener Sport-Club/Post
SC Magdalen	3–3 (a.e.t.) (5–6 p)	FC Admira/Wacker
13 September 1978
Favoritner AC	2–2 (a.e.t.) (3–0 p)	SC Eisenstadt
15 September 1978
Wolfsberger AC	1–1 (a.e.t.) (4–5 p)	SK Sturm Graz
SC Amateure St. Veit	0–1	SK Austria Klagenfurt
Vorwärts Steyr	3–1	FK Austria Wien
ASK Salzburg	0–4	SSW Innsbruck

== Third round ==
Team 1	Score	Team 2
24 October 1978
SK VOEST Linz	2–1	First Vienna FC
25 October 1978
SK Austria Klagenfurt	1–2	FC Admira/Wacker
Kremser SC	1–3	Grazer AK
SSW Innsbruck	1–0	Donawitzer SV Alpine
Schwarz-Weiß Bregenz	1–3	SV Austria Salzburg
26 October 1978
SK Sturm Graz	4–0	SV Jenbach
Vorwärts Steyr	2–3 (a.e.t.)	1. Wiener Neustädter SC
Favoritner AC	0–6	SK Rapid Wien

== Quarter-finals ==
Team 1	Score	Team 2
17 February 1979
SK VOEST Linz	1–0 (a.e.t.)	1. Wiener Neustädter SC
18 February 1979
SSW Innsbruck	2–0	SV Austria Salzburg
6 March 1979
Grazer AK	1–2	SK Rapid Wien
7 March 1979
SK Sturm Graz	0–1	FC Admira/Wacker

== Semi-finals ==
Team 1	Score	Team 2
17 April 1979
FC Admira/Wacker	2–1	SK VOEST Linz
18 April 1979
SK Rapid Wien	0–2	SSW Innsbruck

== Final ==
=== First leg ===
6 June 1979
19:00

SSW Innsbruck	1–0	Admira/Wacker
Seubert 35'	Report

Tivoli, Innsbruck
Attendance: 5,500
Referee: Wilhelm Jarosch

=== Second leg ===
20 June 1979
19:00

Admira/Wacker	1–1	SSW Innsbruck
Kroboth 88'	Report	Zanon 57'

Bundesstadion Südstadt, Maria Enzersdorf
Attendance: 4,000
Referee: Erich Linemayr

SSW Innsbruck won 2–1 on aggregate.
