= Music in the Blood =

Music in the Blood (German: Musik im Blut) may refer to:

- Music in the Blood (1934 film), a German film directed by Erich Waschneck
- Music in the Blood (1955 film), a West German film directed by Erik Ode
