= Pajenk =

Pajenk is a Slovene surname. Notable people with the surname include:

- Alen Pajenk (born 1986), Slovenian volleyball player
- Egon Pajenk (1950–2022), Austrian footballer
