= Theodor Hoffmann =

Theodor Hoffmann is the name of:

- Theodor Hoffmann (admiral) (1935–2018), former minister of Defence of East Germany
- Theodor Hoffmann (footballer) (1940–2011), German football (soccer) player
