= Hans Krankl =

Austrian footballer

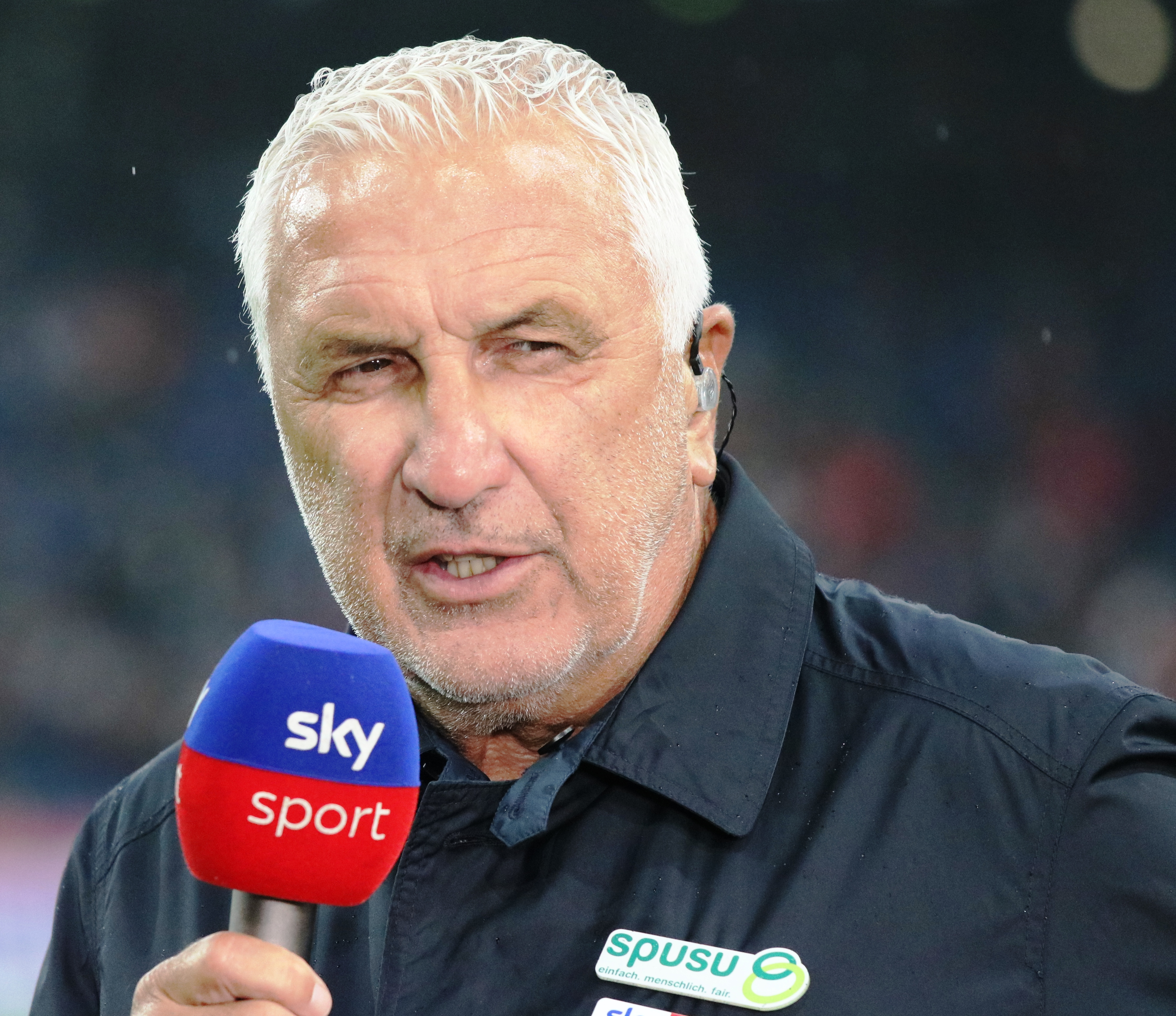
- Krankl in 2022

Personal information
- Full name: Johann Krankl
- Date of birth: 14 February 1953 (age 73)
- Place of birth: Vienna, Austria
- Height: 1.82 m (5 ft 11 1/2 in)
- Position: Striker

Senior career*
Years	Team	Apps	(Gls)
1970–1978	Rapid Wien	205	(160)
1971–1972	→ Wiener AC (loan)	26	(27)
1978–1981	Barcelona	46	(34)
1979–1980	→ First Vienna (loan)	17	(13)
1981–1986	Rapid Wien	145	(107)
1986–1988	Wiener Sport-Club	60	(40)
1988	Kremser SC	5	(1)
1989	Austria Salzburg	14	(10)
Total		518	(392)

International career
1973–1985	Austria	69	(34)

Managerial career
- 1987: Wiener Sport-Club (caretaker)
- 1987–1988: Wiener Sport-Club
- 1989–1992: Rapid Wien
- 1992–1994: Mödling
- 1994–1995: Tirol Innsbruck
- 1996: Mödling
- 1997: SV Gerasdorf
- 1998–1999: Austria Salzburg
- 2000: Fortuna Köln
- 2000–2001: Admira Wacker Mödling
- 2002–2005: Austria
- 2009: LASK Linz
- * Club domestic league appearances and goals

Johann "Hans" Krankl (German: [hans ˈkʁaŋkl̩]; born 14 February 1953) is an Austrian former professional footballer. A prolific striker, he is regarded by many as one of Austria's greatest players.

== Club career ==
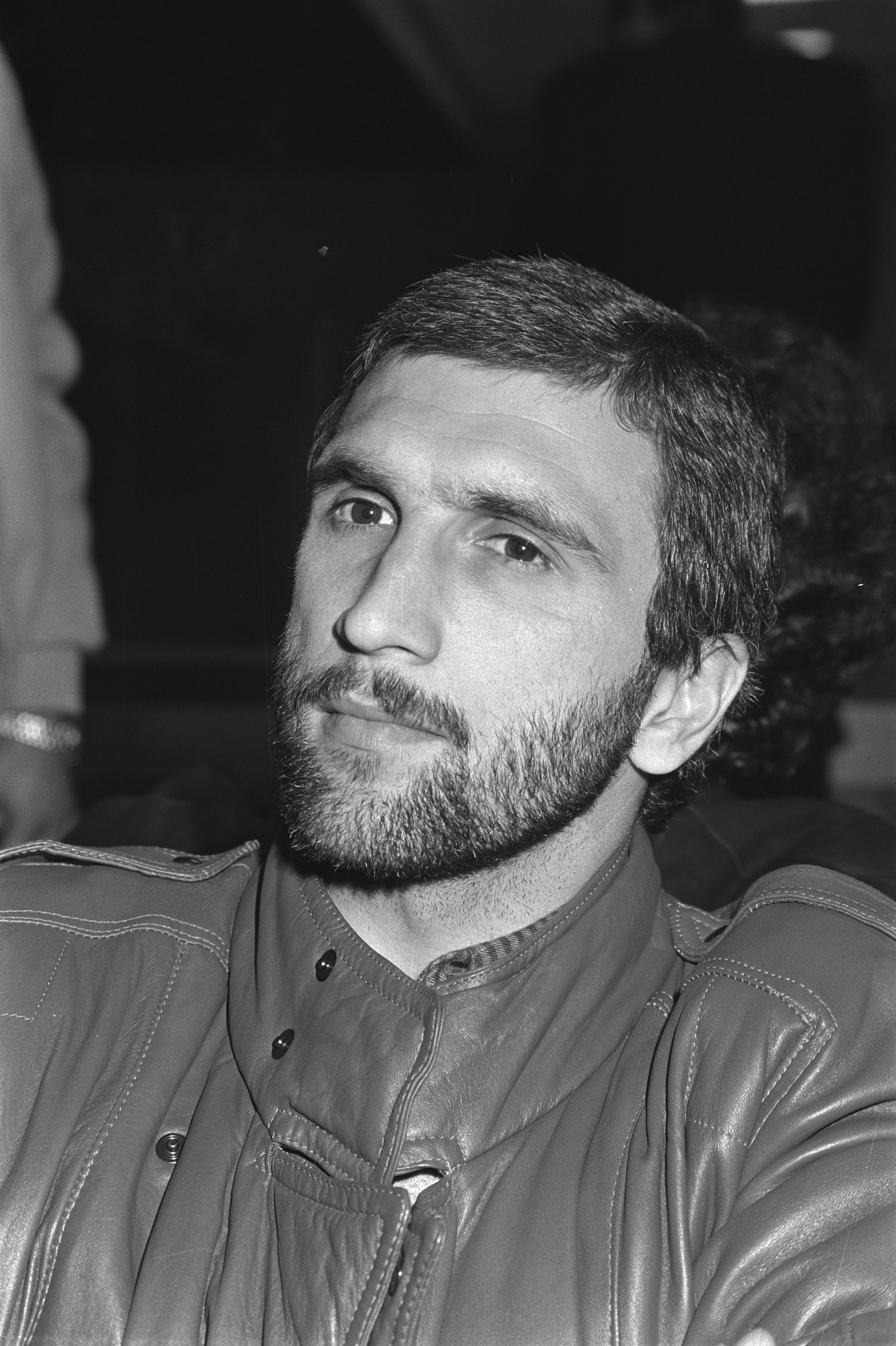
Krankl in 1981

Krankl started his professional career at Rapid Wien and stayed there for 8 years, apart from a year at Wiener AC. He won the European Golden Boot at Rapid Wien in 1978, attracting the interest of Barcelona. His spell at Barcelona was successful, winning the European Cup Winners' Cup (scoring in the final itself), and picking up the top goalscorer's award in La Liga that season with 29 goals. He returned to Rapid Wien in 1981, captaining the side and again scoring over 100 goals for them over the next 5 years. He played a major part in the most successful of Rapid teams in the 1980s, claiming the League crown twice, in 1982 and 1983, and three consecutive Austrian cup titles. He scored Rapid's only goal in the 3–1 loss in the European Cup Winners' Cup Final in 1985 against Everton. In 1986, he moved to become player-manager at Wiener Sport-Club.

Krankl was named Austrian Player of the Year a record five times, and was voted the most popular Austrian player of the last 25 years.

== International career ==
Krankl made his debut for Austria in a June 1973 friendly match against Brazil and was a participant at the 1978 and 1982 FIFA World Cups. He earned 69 caps, scoring 34 goals. His final international game was an April 1985 World Cup qualification match against Hungary. In the 1978–79 season of the Spanish Primera División, he was the top goalscorer with 29 goals for Barcelona and was awarded the Pichichi Trophy.

In a match against Malta in 1977, Krankl scored six goals as Austria ran out 9–0 winners.

One of his major achievements was helping Austria qualify for the 1978 FIFA World Cup, the first time Austria had qualified for the World Cup in twenty years. He then went on to score a brace, including the winning goal, against West Germany in a game dubbed The miracle of Córdoba, which the Austrians won 3–2 and which was Austria's first win against West Germany in 47 years, earning Krankl legendary status in his homeland. Scored in the 88th minute, the live footage of the goal still regularly features on national television, and the audio commentary ("Tor Tor Tor Tor Tor Tor, I werd' narrisch" – "Goal goal goal goal goal goal, I'm going crazy") is immediately recognised by Austrian football fans.

== Managerial career ==
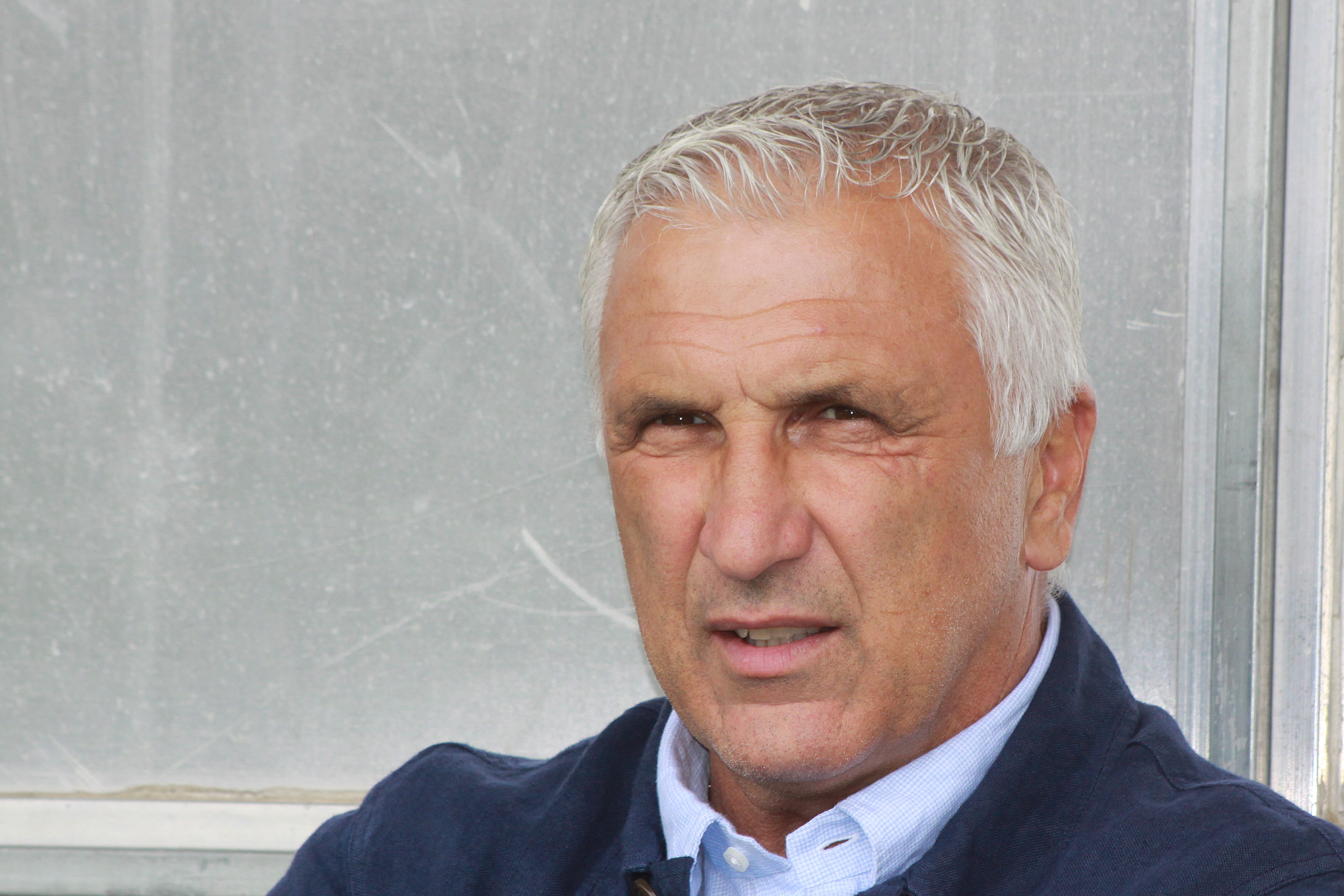
Krankl as manager of LASK Linz in 2009

Since ending his playing career at Austria Salzburg in 1989, Krankl has worked as a football manager and coach. He was employed by the Austria national team. He was sacked on 28 September 2005 after Austria failed to qualify for the 2006 FIFA World Cup. He was also manager of LASK Linz.

He has also intermittently featured as a studio guest and co-commentator on Austrian public service broadcaster ORF.

== Musical career ==
Krankl has also enjoyed domestic success with his music, with several releases entering the Austrian charts. His biggest musical success was the single "Lonely Boy", released in 1985 and peaking at number 2.

== Career statistics ==
=== Club ===
Appearances and goals by club, season and competition
Club	Season	League			National Cup		League Cup		Europe		Total	
Club	Season	Division	Apps	Goals	Apps	Goals	Apps	Goals	Apps	Goals	Apps	Goals
Rapid Wien	1970–71	Austrian Bundesliga	4	0	2	0	–		–		6	0
Rapid Wien	1972–73	Austrian Bundesliga	30	14	8	6	–		4	1	42	21
Rapid Wien	1973–74	Austrian Bundesliga	32	36	6	5	–		4	1	42	42
Rapid Wien	1974–75	Austrian Bundesliga	33	17	3	0	–		4	1	40	18
Rapid Wien	1975–76	Austrian Bundesliga	35	20	6	6	–		2	1	43	27
Rapid Wien	1976–77	Austrian Bundesliga	35	32	1	2	–		2	1	38	35
Rapid Wien	1977–78	Austrian Bundesliga	36	41	3	1	–		2	0	41	42
Rapid Wien	Total		207	160	27	20	–		18	5	252	185
Wiener AC (loan)	1971–72		26	27			–		–		26	27
Barcelona	1978–79	La Liga	30	29	1	1	–		9	5	40	36
Barcelona	1979–80	La Liga	9	2	0	0	–		3	4	12	6
Barcelona	1980–81	La Liga	7	3	0	0	–		1	0	8	3
Barcelona	Total		46	34	1	1	–		13	9	60	45
First Vienna (loan)	1979–80	Austrian Bundesliga	17	12			–		–		17+	12+
Rapid Wien	1980–81	Austrian Bundesliga	18	16	1	0	–		–		19	16
Rapid Wien	1981–82	Austrian Bundesliga	32	19	2	1	–		6	3	40	23
Rapid Wien	1982–83	Austrian Bundesliga	26	23	7	9	–		4	4	37	36
Rapid Wien	1983–84	Austrian Bundesliga	27	17	7	8	–		6	1	40	26
Rapid Wien	1984–85	Austrian Bundesliga	25	14	7	12	–		8	4	40	30
Rapid Wien	1985–86	Austrian Bundesliga	17	18	1	1	–		3	1	21	20
Rapid Wien	Total		145	107	25	31	–		27	13	197	151
Wiener Sport-Club	1986–87		27	20			–		–		27+	20+
Wiener Sport-Club	1987–88		33	20	2+	1	–		–		35+	21
Wiener Sport-Club	Total		60	40			–		–		60+	40+
Kremser SC	1988–89	Austrian First League	5	1	0	0	–		–		5+	1+
Austria Salzburg	1988–89	Austrian First League	14	10	2	0	–		–		16	10
Career total			473	354	59+	53	–		58	27	590+	472+

=== International ===
Scores and results list Austria's goal tally first.

List of international goals scored by Hans Krankl
No.	Date	Venue	Opponent	Score	Result	Competition
1.	27 March 1974	De Kuip, Rotterdam	Netherlands	1–0	1–1	Friendly
2.	4 September 1974	Praterstadion, Vienna	Wales	2–1	2–1	Euro 1976 qualifier
3.	28 September 1974	Praterstadion, Vienna	Hungary	1–0	1–0	Friendly
4.	16 March 1975	Stade Municipal, Luxembourg	Luxembourg	2–1	2–1	Euro 1976 qualifier
5.	24 September 1975	Népstadion, Budapest	Hungary	1–2	1–2	Euro 1976 qualifier
6.	15 October 1975	Praterstadion, Vienna	Luxembourg	2–2	6–2	Euro 1976 qualifier
7.	15 October 1975	Praterstadion, Vienna	Luxembourg	5–2	6–2	Euro 1976 qualifier
8.	22 September 1976	Linzer Stadion, Linz	Switzerland	1–0	3–1	Friendly
9.	13 October 1976	Praterstadion, Vienna	Hungary	1–2	2–4	Friendly
10.	13 October 1976	Praterstadion, Vienna	Hungary	2–2	2–4	Friendly
11.	10 November 1976	Anthi Karagianni Stadium, Kavala	Greece	2–0	3–0	Friendly
12.	5 December 1976	Empire Stadium, Gżira	Malta	1–0	1–0	1978 World Cup qualifier
13.	15 December 1976	National Stadium, Ramat Gan	Israel	3–1	3–1	Friendly
14.	30 April 1977	Stadion Lehen, Salzburg	Malta	1–0	9–0	1978 World Cup qualifier
15.	30 April 1977	Stadion Lehen, Salzburg	Malta	2–0	9–0	1978 World Cup qualifier
16.	30 April 1977	Stadion Lehen, Salzburg	Malta	3–0	9–0	1978 World Cup qualifier
17.	30 April 1977	Stadion Lehen, Salzburg	Malta	4–0	9–0	1978 World Cup qualifier
18.	30 April 1977	Stadion Lehen, Salzburg	Malta	6–0	9–0	1978 World Cup qualifier
19.	30 April 1977	Stadion Lehen, Salzburg	Malta	8–0	9–0	1978 World Cup qualifier
20.	24 August 1977	Praterstadion, Vienna	Poland	2–0	2–1	Friendly
21.	15 February 1978	Nea Filadelfeia Stadium, Athens	Greece	1–1	1–1	Friendly
22.	3 June 1978	José Amalfitani Stadium, Buenos Aires	Spain	2–1	2–1	1978 World Cup
23.	7 June 1978	José Amalfitani Stadium, Buenos Aires	Sweden	1–0	1–0	1978 World Cup
24.	21 June 1978	Estadio Chateau Carreras, Córdoba	West Germany	2–1	3–2	1978 World Cup
25.	21 June 1978	Estadio Chateau Carreras, Córdoba	West Germany	3–2	3–2	1978 World Cup
26.	30 August 1978	Ullevaal Stadium, Oslo	Norway	2–0	2–0	Euro 1980 qualifier
27.	28 March 1979	Parc Astrid, Brussels	Belgium	1–1	1–1	Euro 1980 qualifier
28.	29 August 1979	Praterstadion, Vienna	Norway	4–0	4–0	Euro 1980 qualifier
29.	17 October 1979	Hampden Park, Glasgow	Scotland	1–0	1–1	Euro 1980 qualifier
30.	15 November 1980	Praterstadion, Vienna	Albania	5–0	5–0	1982 World Cup qualifier
31	28 May 1981	Praterstadion, Vienna	Bulgaria	1–0	2–0	1982 World Cup qualifier
32.	17 June 1981	Linzer Stadion, Linz	Finland	3–0	3–0	1982 World Cup qualifier
33.	24 March 1982	Népstadion, Budapest	Hungary	1–0	3–2	Friendly
34.	21 June 1982	Estadio Carlos Tartiere, Oviedo	Algeria	2–0	2–0	1982 World Cup

== Honours ==
=== Club ===
Rapid Wien

- Austrian Football Bundesliga: 1981–82, 1982–83
- Austrian Cup: 1975–76, 1982–83, 1983–84, 1984–85

Barcelona

- Copa del Rey: 1980–81
- European Cup Winners' Cup: 1978–79

=== Individual ===
- Ballon d'Or Silver Ball: 1978
- Onze d'Argent: 1978
- Onze Mondial: 1978, 1979
- Sport Ideal European XI: 1978
- Austrian Player of the Year: 1973, 1974, 1977, 1982, 1988
- Austrian Bundesliga Top Goalscorer: 1973–74, 1976–77, 1977–78, 1982–83
- Pichichi Trophy: 1978–79
- European Golden Shoe: 1978
- Austrian Manager of the Year: 1999

== See also ==
- List of men's footballers with 500 or more goals
- List of FIFA World Cup top goalscorers
- List of foreign La Liga players
