= Wilhelm Kaipel =

Austrian footballer and coach

Personal information
- Date of birth: 20 November 1948 (age 77)
- Position: Goalkeeper

Senior career*
Years	Team	Apps	(Gls)
1966–1971	Wiener Sport-Club		
1971–1975	SV Austria Salzburg		
1975–1977	SK Vöest Linz		

Managerial career
- 1988: SK Rapid Wien
- 1992–1993: Wiener Sport-Club
- 1993: Wiener Sport-Club (caretaker)
- 1994: VSE St. Pölten
- 1995: SV Oberwart
- 2001–2002: Wiener Sport-Club
- 2003: SV Neuberg
- 2004: Wiener Sport-Club
- 2006: Wiener Sport-Club
- 2013: Wiener Sport-Club (caretaker)
- * Club domestic league appearances and goals

Wilhelm Kaipel (born 20 November 1948) is an Austrian former footballer and coach.
