= Emil Krause (footballer, born 1950) =

German footballer (born 1949)

Personal information
- Date of birth: 25 October 1950 (age 76)
- Place of birth: Hanover, Lower Saxony, West Germany
- Position: Right winger

Youth career
- ???–1969: Arminia Hannover

Senior career*
Years	Team	Apps	(Gls)
1969–1971	Arminia Hannover		(0)
1971–1973	OSV Hannover		
1973–1978	Rapid Wien	154	(4)
1978–1980	Arminia Hannover	27	(0)

International career
1969	West Germany U18	2	(0)
- * Club domestic league appearances and goals

Emil Krause (born 25 October 1950) is a retired German footballer. He primarily played for Arminia Hannover in Germany and Rapid Wien in Austria throughout the 1970s. He also briefly represented his home country of West Germany for the 1969 UEFA European Under-18 Championship.

== Club career ==
Krause first played for SV Arminia Hannover throughout his youth career, advancing to the senior team in 1969 before later playing for local rivals OSV Hannover with whom he was promoted to the second-tier Regionalliga under coach Gerd Bohnsack. In the 1972–73 season, he played for OSV Hannover in the then second-tier Regionalliga Nord and twice in the competition for the 1972–73 DFB-Pokal in the two first-round matches against Hertha BSC in which the club lost 6–0 and 3–0. These poor results prompted Krause to move to Austria to play for Rapid Wien.

He made his debut during the final edition of the Austrian football championship during the 1973–74 season and from 1974 to 1978, in the newly founded Austrian Bundesliga. In his first season, he played in the 1973–74 European Cup Winners' Cup, beating out Randers Freja in the first round. He then played in the two second round matches on 24 October and 7 November 1973 against AC Milan. In the Austrian football championship, he played 29 games, making his debut on 22 August 1973 in the 6-4 win in the home game against Donawitzer SV Alpine and scored his only goal of the season on 30 March 1974 in the 2-2 draw in an away game against SK VÖEST Linz with the goal for the final score in the 70th minute. With third place at the end of the season, his team qualified for the 1974–75 UEFA Cup. He played the two first-round matches against Aris Saloniki and the two second-round matches against FK Velež Mostar. In the inaugural season of the Austrian Bundesliga, 3rd place was again enough to play in the 1975–76 UEFA Cup but narrowly lost in the group stage against Galatasaray following the two first-round matches. At the end of the 1975–76 season, he again finished third in the Austrian Bundesliga and played in the victorious final of the ÖFB Cup. Krause once again played two games in the 1976–77 European Cup Winners' Cup in the two first-round matches against Atlético Madrid where the club once again, was narrowly eliminated from the competition. By the end of the 1976–77 season, the club were runners-up for the first time and directly qualified for the 1977–78 UEFA Cup where he and his club were once again were eliminated in the first round by Inter Bratislava. Within the Austrian Bundesliga, the club was once more runners-up at the end of the 1977–78 season and after a total of 154 games and four goals and 17 domestic cup games, left the team and returned to Germany.

Returning to Germany, he played 26 games for SV Arminia Hannover in the 1978–79 season in the North Group of the then 2. Bundesliga and only one in the following season, at the end of which relegation to the Oberliga Nord was set and Krause retired in the following season.

== International career ==
Krause took part in the 1969 UEFA European Under-18 Championship held in East Germany with the West Germany U-18 and played in two games. He made his debut as an international on 20 May in Zeitz in the 1-0 defeat against France as a substitute for Klaus Hommrich. Two days later, he played for the entire match in Altenburg, Thuringia in a 2-1 win over Spain.
