= Music in the Blood (1955 film) =

1955 film directed by Erik Ode

- Directed by: Erik Ode
- Written by: Werner Eplinius; Janne Furch
- Produced by: Waldemar Frank
- Starring: Viktor de Kowa; Nadia Gray; Waltraut Haas
- Cinematography: Karl Löb
- Production company: CCC Film
- Distributed by: Europa-Film
- Release date: 20 December 1955
- Running time: 107 minutes
- Country: West Germany
- Language: German

Music in the Blood (German: Musik im Blut) is a 1955 West German musical film directed by Erik Ode and starring Viktor de Kowa, Nadia Gray and Waltraut Haas. It portrays the life of the musician Kurt Widmann.

It was shot at the Wandsbek Studios in Hamburg and on location in Amsterdam and Berlin. The film's sets were designed by the art director Albrecht Becker and Herbert Kirchhoff.

== Cast ==
- Viktor de Kowa as Kurt Widmann
- Nadia Gray as Gina Martelli
- Waltraut Haas as Angelika Jäger
- Walter Gross as Angelika
- Ruth Stephan as Irma Pehlke
- Loni Heuser as Cilly Mainsburg
- Heidi Ewert as Häschen
- Gitta Lind as Singer
- Bill Ramsey as Singer
- Edward Tierney as John Miller

== Bibliography ==
- Bock, Hans-Michael & Bergfelder, Tim. The Concise CineGraph. Encyclopedia of German Cinema. Berghahn Books, 2009.
