= Günther Happich =

Austrian footballer

Personal information
- Date of birth: 28 January 1952
- Place of birth: Austria
- Date of death: 16 October 1995 (aged 43)
- Height: 5 ft 11 in (1.80 m)
- Position: Midfielder

Senior career*
Years	Team	Apps	(Gls)
1970–1978	Wiener Sport-Club		
1978–1980	SK Rapid Wien	51	(7)
1980–1983	Wiener Sport-Club		
1983–1985	First Vienna FC	21	(2)

International career
1978	Austria	5	(0)
- * Club domestic league appearances and goals

Günther Happich (28 January 1952 – 16 October 1995) was an Austrian football midfielder who played for Austria in the 1978 FIFA World Cup. He also played for Wiener Sport-Club, SK Rapid Wien, and First Vienna FC.
