= Alois Jagodic =

Austrian footballer (born 1946)

Personal information
- Date of birth: 24 March 1946 (age 80)
- Place of birth: Austria
- Height: 1.76 m (5 ft 9 in)
- Positions: Right midfielder; right-back

Senior career*
Years	Team	Apps	(Gls)
1967–1968	Austria Klagenfurt	20	(2)
1968–1969	ASK Klagenfurt		
1969–1972	Rapid Wien	80	(8)
1972–1977	Austria Klagenfurt		
1977–1978	Villacher SV		

International career
1971	Austria	2	(0)

Managerial career
- 1990–1991: SVG Bleiburg
- 1992: Austria Klagenfurt
- 2009–2014: SAK Klagenfurt
- * Club domestic league appearances and goals

Alois Jagodic (born 24 March 1946) is an Austrian former footballer who played as a right midfielder or right-back. He made two appearances for the Austria national team in 1971, including in a match against then-reigning champions Brazil, where his direct opponent was the legendary Pelé. In 2016 Jagodic resigned from SAK and became coach of Mittlern. In 2024 he was recognised as one of the "Legends and Legionnaires" of FC Kärnten.
