= Günther Wessely =

Austrian footballer and manager

Personal information
- Date of birth: 5 August 1959 (age 67)
- Place of birth: Austria

Senior career*
| Years | Team | Apps | (Gls) |
| 1978–1979 | SK Rapid Wien | | |

Managerial career
- 1995–1997: SV Schwechat
- 2002–2003: SC Himberg
- 2005–2006: SKN St. Pölten
- 2008–2009: ASK Kottingbrunn
- 2001–2011: ASK Kottingbrunn
- * Club domestic league appearances and goals

Günther Wessely (born 5 August 1959) is a retired Austrian football player and a football manager who last managed ASK Kottingbrunn.

== Playing career ==
Wessely played as a defender for SK Rapid Wien.

== Coaching career ==
Wessely managed in the Austrian lower divisions between 1995 and 2011.
