= Kutte Widmann =

German jazz musician

Kutte Widman
- Birth name: Kurt Widman
- Born: 2 March 1906; Berlin
- Died: 27 November 1954 (aged 48); Berlin
- Genres: jazz
- Instruments: drums; accordion; trombone

Kurt "Kutte" Widman (2 March 1906 – 27 November 1954) was a German bandleader and jazz musician.

Widmann started out on drums, then later learned to play accordion and trombone. He was playing locally by 1924, and led a quintet at the Hotel Imperator in Berlin in 1933 which played swing jazz; Hans Berry was one of his sidemen. He directed his own dance orchestra from 1938 to 1942, which frequently appeared at the Haus Vaterland. He recorded in 1938–1939, including under various pseudonyms such as Billy Blackmoore, John Weepster, and John Webb. Once war began with England, censorship forbade these names, but the band was allowed to continue performing, including at events for German troops. Widmann was drafted to the Wehrmacht during the war but was released in 1944 for health reasons. He continued playing events in Germany even as Allied troops began invading, playing cinema houses in between films.

After the war, Widmann formed a new band which played during the American occupation, sometimes using older arrangements from the war period, but also employing Berlin-based arranger Walter Jenson. He recorded again in the late 1940s, and died of a stroke in 1954. The 1955 film Music in the Blood, directed by Erik Ode, is based on his life with Viktor de Kowa in the lead role.
