= Karl Schlechta =

Austrian footballer (1922–2016)

Personal information
- Date of birth: 28 January 1922
- Place of birth: Meidling, Austria
- Date of death: 5 September 2016 (aged 94)
- Position: Forward

Senior career*
Years	Team	Apps	(Gls)
- Hakoah
- Wacker Wien
- Post SV
–1952	FAC		

Managerial career
- Wacker Wien
- 1960–1963: Austria Wien
- 1962–1964: LASK
- 1965–1966: Wiener Sport-Club
- 1970–1971: Austria Salzburg
- 1972: Admira/Wacker
- 1972–1977: Sturm Graz
- 1978–1979: Rapid Wien
- 1980–1981: Wiener Sport-Club
- * Club domestic league appearances and goals

Karl Schlechta (28 January 1922 – 5 September 2016) was an Austrian football player and coach who played as a forward.

== Death ==
Schlechta died on 5 September 2016, at the age of 94.
