= Josef Pecanka =

Austrian sportsperson (1925–2015)

Personal information
- Date of birth: 7 April 1925
- Place of birth: Vienna, Austria
- Date of death: 28 July 2015 (aged 90)

Senior career*
Years	Team	Apps	(Gls)
1953–1957	1. Simmeringer SC		

Managerial career
- 1973–1974: Austria Wien
- 1975: Rapid Wien
- * Club domestic league appearances and goals

Josef Pecanka (7 April 1925 – 28 July 2015) was an Austrian field hockey player, footballer, and coach.
