= Helmut Kirisits =

Austrian footballer (born 1954)

Personal information
- Full name: Helmut Andreas Kirisits
- Date of birth: 12 May 1954 (age 72)
- Place of birth: Austria
- Position: Midfielder

Senior career*
Years	Team	Apps	(Gls)
1973–1976	Grazer AK	51	(10)
1976–1979	SK Rapid Wien	91	(19)
1979–1981	Panathinaikos		
1981–1984	OFI	19	(3)
1984	FC Stahl Linz	15	(1)
1985–1986	Grazer AK	12	(1)
1986–1988	ATSV Wolfsberg		
1988–1992	Wolfsberger AC	34	(5)
1992	FC Zeltweg		
1993	FC St. Michael		
- * Club domestic league appearances and goals

Helmut Andreas Kirisits (born 12 May 1954) is an Austrian footballer who played as a midfielder.

== Early life ==
Kirisits started his career with Austrian side Grazer AK. He came from a family that immigrated to the Lavanttal from Stinatz, the Croatian-speaking part of Burgenland, in the early 1950s.

== Career ==
Kirisits managed Austrian side ATSV Wolfsberg. He helped the club achieve second place in the league.

== Personal life ==
Kirisits was born in 1954 in Austria. He has a brother.
