= Arnošt Hložek =

Slovak football player and coach (1929–2013)

Personal information
- Date of birth: 11 December 1929
- Place of birth: Bratislava, Czechoslovakia
- Date of death: 19 December 2013 (aged 84)
- Place of death: Bratislava, Slovakia
- Position: Defender

Youth career
- 1940–1949: Slovan Bratislava

Senior career*
| Years | Team | Apps | (Gls) |
| 1949–1952 | Slovan Bratislava | | |
| 1953–1962 | Inter Bratislava | | |

Managerial career
- 1962–1966: Inter Bratislava
- 1966–1967: Dukla Banská Bystrica
- 1967–1969: MŠK Žilina
- 1969–1971: First Vienna
- 1972–1975: Rapid Wien
- 1975–1976: Inter Bratislava
- 1976–1978: Sparta Prague
- 1978–1979: TTS Trenčín
- 1982–1984: Inter Bratislava
- 1984–1987: First Vienna
- 1987: Wiener Sport-Club
- 1987–1988: LASK
- 1989–1990: SC Zwettl
- * Club domestic league appearances and goals

Arnošt Hložek (11 December 1929 – 19 December 2013), also called Ernst Hložek, was a Slovak football coach and player.

He played for Slovan Bratislava and Inter Bratislava.

He coached Inter Bratislava, Dukla Banská Bystrica, MŠK Žilina, First Vienna, Rapid Wien, Sparta Prague, TTS Trenčín, Wiener Sport-Club, LASK and SC Zwettl.
