= Theodor Hoffmann (footballer) =

German footballer

Personal information
- Date of birth: 5 July 1940
- Place of birth: Östringen, Germany
- Date of death: 31 October 2011 (aged 71)
- Height: 1.80 m (5 ft 11 in)
- Positions: Defender; midfielder

Senior career*
Years	Team	Apps	(Gls)
1960–1970	VfB Stuttgart	215	(13)
1970–1971	SK Rapid Wien	25	
- * Club domestic league appearances and goals

Theodor Hoffmann (5 July 1940 – 31 October 2011) was a German football player. He spent eight seasons in the Bundesliga with VfB Stuttgart. The best finish in the league he achieved was fifth place.
