= Ernst Dokupil =

Austrian footballer and coach

Personal information
- Date of birth: 24 April 1947 (age 79)
- Place of birth: Vienna, Austria

Youth career
- 1960–1963: WAC
- 1963–: 1. Simmeringer SC

Senior career*
Years	Team	Apps	(Gls)
1969–1971	SC Wacker Wien		
1971–1973	Admira/Wacker		
1973–1974	1. Simmeringer SC		
1974–1976	SK Rapid Wien	54	(9)
1976–1979	1. Simmeringer SC		

Managerial career
- 1979–1982: 1. Simmeringer SC
- 1982–1986: Admira/Wacker
- 1987–1989: First Vienna FC
- 1994: VSE St. Pölten
- 1994–1998: SK Rapid Wien
- 2000–2001: SK Rapid Wien
- * Club domestic league appearances and goals

Ernst Dokupil (born 24 April 1947) is a retired Austrian footballer and coach.
