= Helmut Maurer =

Austrian footballer and coach

Personal information
- Date of birth: 7 November 1945 (age 80)
- Position: Goalkeeper

Youth career
- SK Rapid Wien

Senior career*
Years	Team	Apps	(Gls)
1966–1967	Red Star		
1967–1970	ASV Wienerberg		
1970–1974	1. Simmeringer SC		
1974–1976	SK Rapid Wien	37	(0)
1976–1977	1. Simmeringer SC		

International career
1974	Austria	1	(0)

Managerial career
- 1980–1981: First Vienna FC
- * Club domestic league appearances and goals

Helmut Maurer (born 7 November 1945) is an Austrian retired footballer and coach.
