= Rainer Schlagbauer =

Austrian footballer (1949–2022)

Personal information
- Date of birth: 24 July 1949
- Date of death: 19 April 2022 (aged 72)
- Position: Midfielder

Senior career*
Years	Team	Apps	(Gls)
- SC Ortmann
- 1. Wiener Neustädter SC
- First Vienna FC
- Rapid Wien

International career
1971–1974	Austria	2	(0)
- * Club domestic league appearances and goals

Rainer Schlagbauer (24 July 1949 – 19 April 2022) was an Austrian footballer who played as a midfielder. He made two appearances for the Austria national team from 1971 to 1974.

== Career ==
=== Clubs ===
Schlagbauer began his career in 1969 at 1. Wiener Neustädter SC. Just one year later he moved to First Vienna FC, for which he scored 27 goals in 104 league games until 1974. For the 1974/75 season he moved to local rivals SK Rapid Wien. For Rapid he played 82 games in the Austrian Football Bundesliga, in which he scored six goals.

In 1976 he won the Austrian Football Cup with Rapid.

=== Austrian national team ===
Schlagbauer made his international debut in the Austrian national team's 4–1 win in the 1972 European Championship qualifying game against Ireland in Dublin in 1971, when he came as a substitute for Werner Kriess in the 72nd minute. He played his second international game for the national team in the qualifying game for the 1976 European Championship in the Austrians' 2-1 win against Wales in front of their home crowd in Vienna.
