= Gerhard Sturmberger =

Austrian footballer

Personal information
- Date of birth: 1 May 1940
- Place of birth: Klagenfurt, Austria
- Date of death: 13 January 1990 (aged 49)
- Place of death: Klagenfurt, Austria
- Position: Defender

Senior career*
Years	Team	Apps	(Gls)
–1959	ASK Klagenfurt		
1959–1973	LASK	333	(20)
1973–1976	SK Rapid Wien	64	(0)

International career
1965–1973	Austria	43	(0)
- * Club domestic league appearances and goals

Gerhard Sturmberger (1 May 1940 – 13 January 1990) was an Austrian footballer playing as a defender from 1959 to 1976. He played on the Austria national team for 5 years, from 1965 - 1973, he appeared in 43 international matches.
