= Peter Persidis =

Austrian footballer

Personal information
- Full name: Dimitris Persidis
- Date of birth: 8 March 1947
- Place of birth: Vienna, Austria
- Date of death: 21 January 2009 (aged 61)
- Place of death: Vienna, Austria
- Position: Defender

Senior career*
Years	Team	Apps	(Gls)
1967–1971	First Vienna	71	(0)
1971–1975	Olympiacos	80	(12)
1975–1982	Rapid Vienna	182	(3)
Total		333	(15)

International career
1976–1978	Austria	7	(0)

Managerial career
- 1986–1987: VSE St. Pölten
- 2001: Rapid Vienna
- * Club domestic league appearances and goals

Peter Persidis (Greek: Δημήτρης Περσίδης; 8 March 1947 – 21 January 2009) was an international Austrian footballer.

== Career ==
His father Kostas Persidis was also a footballer in Greece. He played at Proodeftiki F.C. (1937-1939) and Aris Piraeous (1943-1944). Persidis started his professional career at First Vienna, than returned to his father's home country in the early 1970s, and went on to win three Greek titles with Olympiacos prior to returning to Vienna in 1975 to play for SK Rapid Wien. A sweeper, and the club's captain from 1978 to 1980, he won the 1981–82 Austrian title with Rapid under Hickersberger.

== Coaching career ==
He coached VSE St. Pölten. He also later worked as Josef Hickersberger's assistant at Rapid and was briefly the club's caretaker manager. Persidis took over as Under-19 head coach last summer, having previously worked as assistant to Hickersberger at UEFA EURO 2008. However, he was forced to step down soon afterwards after being diagnosed with a serious illness.

== Death ==
Persidis died in Vienna on 21 January 2009 at the age of 61, with the Austrian Football Association holding a minute's silence in his honour at the national team's friendly against Sweden in Graz on 11 February.
