= August Starek =

Austrian association football player

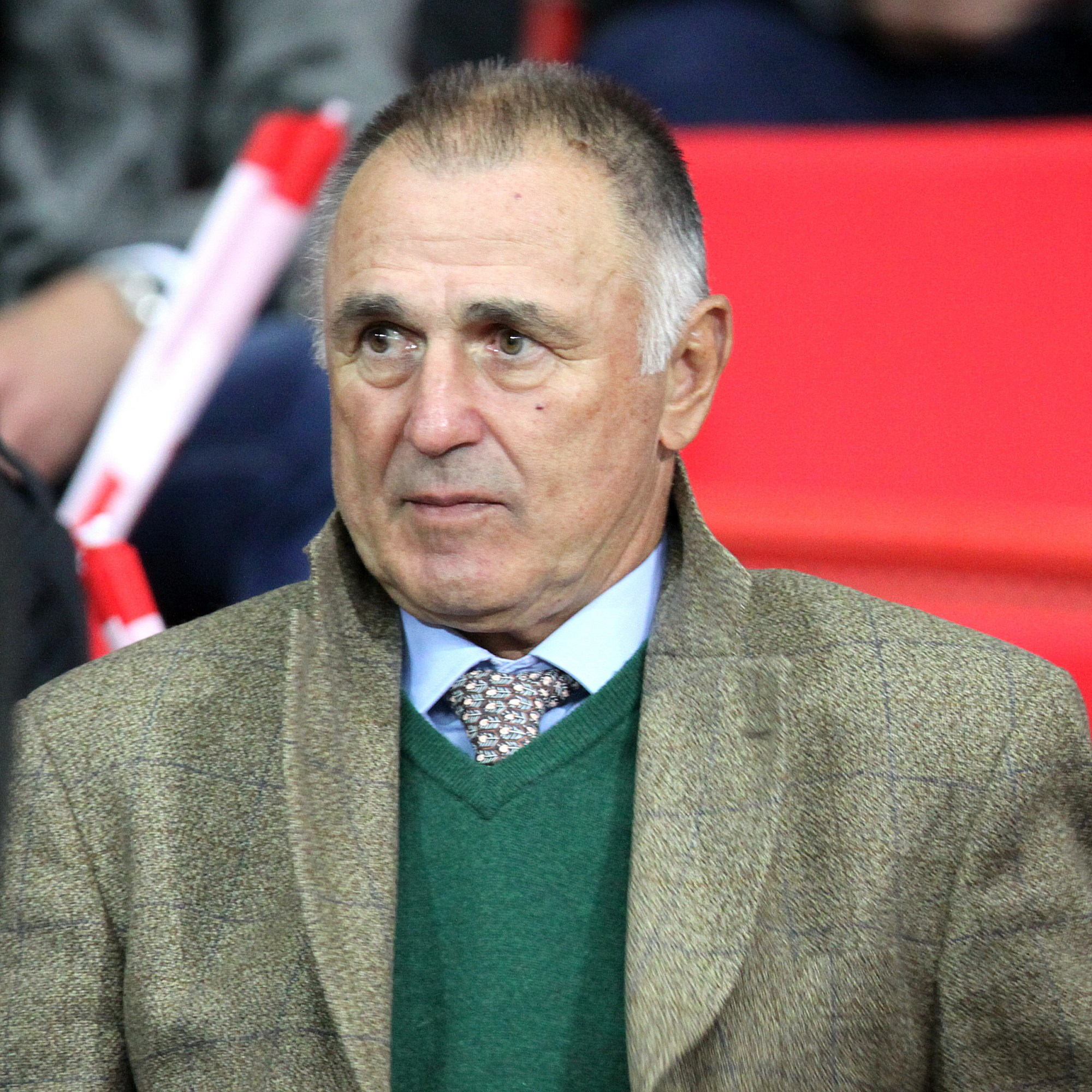
- Starek in 2015

Personal information
- Date of birth: 16 February 1945 (age 81)
- Place of birth: Vienna, Austria
- Height: 1.77 m (5 ft 10 in)
- Position: Midfielder

Senior career*
Years	Team	Apps	(Gls)
1961–1965	1. FC Simmering	15	(1)
1965–1967	SK Rapid Wien	24	(24)
1967–1968	1. FC Nürnberg	24	(5)
1968–1970	Bayern Munich	38	(5)
1970–1971	SK Rapid Wien	18	(0)
1971–1972	1. FC Nürnberg	31	(13)
1972–1973	LASK Linz	27	(6)
1973–1977	SK Rapid Wien	88	(26)
1977–1979	Wiener Sport-Club	62	(15)
1979–1980	First Vienna	16	(0)

International career
1968–1974	Austria	22	(4)

Managerial career
- 1980–1981: Austria Salzburg
- 1981–1982: Grazer AK
- 1982–1985: Admira Wacker
- 1985–1987: Austria (assistant)
- 1985–1987: Austria U-21
- 1988: Austria Wien
- 1989–1991: SK Sturm Graz
- 1992–1993: SK Rapid Wien
- 1994–1996: VfB Leipzig
- 1996–1997: Grazer AK
- 1998–1999: FC Kärnten
- * Club domestic league appearances and goals

August Starek (born 16 February 1945) is a former international Austrian footballer and football manager.

== Club career ==
Starek started his career at 1. FC Simmering, clinching the Regionalliga East title in 1965. He then made a move to SK Rapid Wien, where he secured the Austrian football championship for the 1966–67 season and claimed the season's top scorer title. Transitioning to the German league, he joined 1. FC Nürnberg, contributing to their Bundesliga victory in 1967–68. His journey continued at Bayern Munich, where he triumphed with yet another Bundesliga title in 1968–69, marking a historic milestone as the first player to achieve back-to-back Bundesliga wins with two different clubs.

After his stints in Germany, Starek returned to Rapid Wien, briefly reunited with Nürnberg, and then played for LASK Linz. He once again found success at Rapid Wien, securing the 1976 Austrian Cup. His career path then led him to Wiener Sport-Club before ultimately concluding at First Vienna.

== International career ==
Starek represented the Austrian national team between 1968 and 1974, scoring his first goal on 6 November 1968 in a 2–1 away defeat against Scotland during the 1970 FIFA World Cup qualification.

== Managerial career ==
Starek began his coaching journey at Austria Salzburg for a one-year stint, then moved to Grazer AK for another year, followed by a three-year tenure at Admira Wacker. Between 1985 and 1987, he held a dual coaching role, serving as an assistant coach for the Austrian national team while also leading the Austrian U-21 squad.

Despite finishing second in the 1987–88 Austrian Bundesliga, his coaching tenure at Austria Wien only lasted four months, as he resigned on 16 November 1988, citing controversies with club's managing director Josef Walter, when a new player, Enrique Báez from Montevideo Wanderers, was introduced by the executive committee two days earlier, without consulting Starek. Subsequently, he took on coaching roles at SK Sturm Graz (1989 to 1991) and SK Rapid Wien (1991 to 1993), where he lost the 1992–93 Austrian Cup final.

From 1994 to 1996, he ventured to Germany to coach the second-tier VfB Leipzig. His coaching journey continued in Graz AK and FC Kärnten until 1999, marking almost two decades in coaching, although without any title successes.

== Controversy ==
On 21 November 1970 Starek was excluded from the match between Admira Wacker and Rapid Wien by referee Paul Drabek at the Tivoli in Innsbruck as he lifted his pants, probably due to the insults from the audience, for which he was banned for 10 matches and was fined 5,000 shillings by his club. Since then, he became known as "Gustl Starek" and "der Schwarze Gustl" (German for "the black gustl").

== Honours ==
1. FC Simmering

- Regionalliga East: 1965

Rapid Wien

- Austrian football championship: 1966–67
- Austrian Cup: 1975–76

1. FC Nürnberg

- Bundesliga: 1967–68

Bayern Munich

- Bundesliga: 1968–69
- DFB-Pokal: 1968–69

Individual

- Austrian football championship top scorer: 1966–67 (21 goals)
