= Peter Barthold =

Austrian footballer

Personal information
- Date of birth: 17 February 1954 (age 72)
- Position: Goalkeeper

Senior career*
| Years | Team | Apps | (Gls) |
- Simmering
| 1973–1980 | SK Rapid Wien | 72 | (0) |
| 1980–1982 | Wiener Sport-Club | | |

Managerial career
- 1988–1989: Vorwärts Steyr
- 1990–1991: Favoritner AC
- 1992: VfB Mödling
- 1993–1995: SV Stockerau
- 1995–1997: Wiener Sport-Club
- 1997–1998: First Vienna FC
- * Club domestic league appearances and goals

Peter Barthold (born 17 February 1954) is an Austrian retired footballer.
