= Werner Walzer =

Austrian footballer

Personal information
- Date of birth: 23 August 1947 (age 79)
- Place of birth: Sankt Veit an der Gölsen, Austria
- Position: Midfielder

Youth career
- 1959–1963: WSV Traisen

Senior career*
Years	Team	Apps	(Gls)
1963–1966	WSV Traisen		
1966–1969	FC Tulln		
1969–1979	SK Rapid Wien	267	(16)
1979–1980	1. Wiener Neustädter SC		
1979–1982	Wiener Sport-Club		

International career
1974–1975	Austria	1	(0)
- * Club domestic league appearances and goals

Werner Walzer (born 23 August 1947) is an Austrian retired footballer.
