= Tivoli (Innsbruck) =

Stadium in Austria, 1953–2000

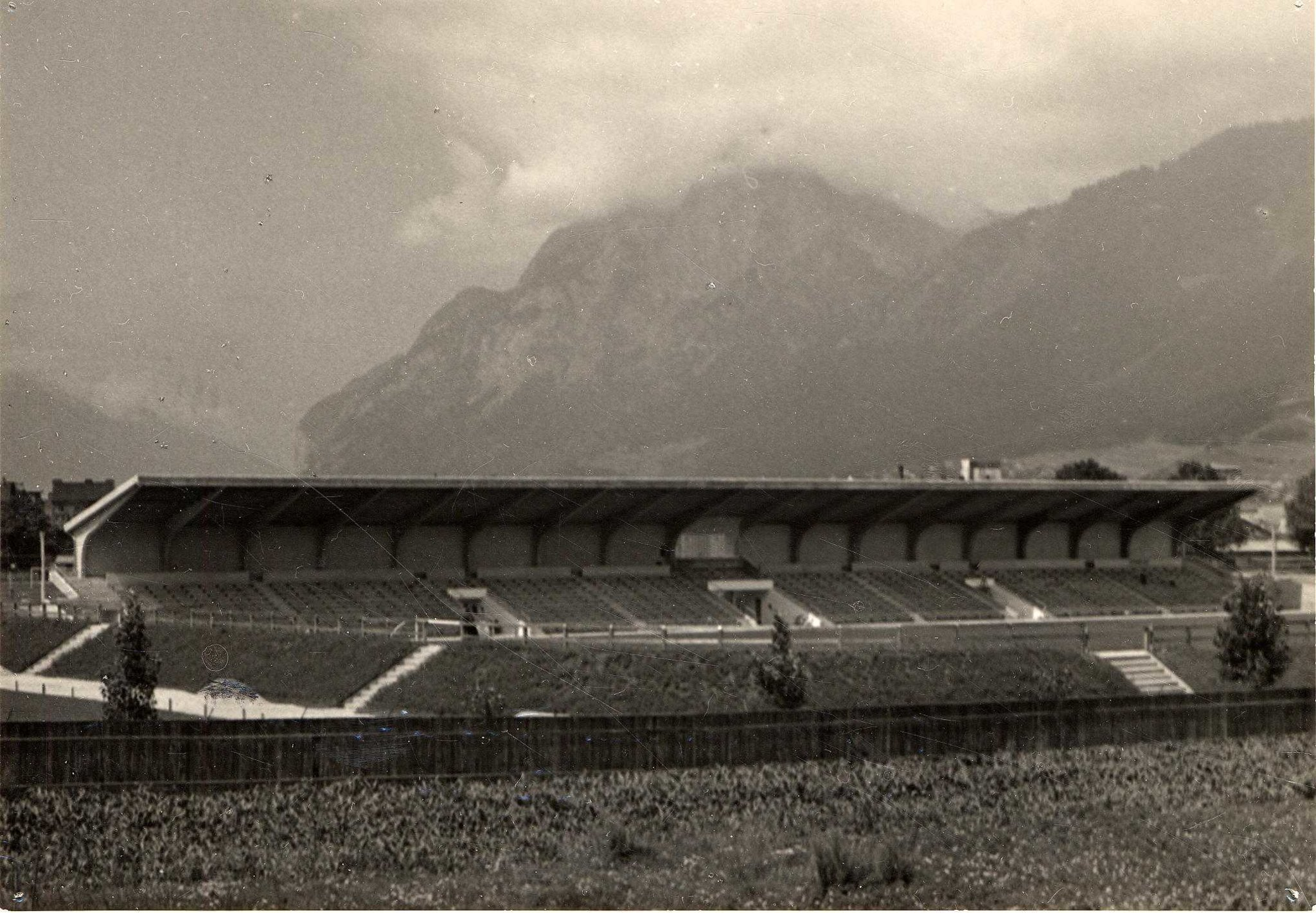
- Tivoli-Stadion in 1955
- Interactive map of Tivoli
- Location: Innsbruck, Austria
- Coordinates: 47°15′31.1″N 11°24′19.7″E
- Capacity: 15,922

Construction
- Opened: 2 August 1953
- Closed: 2000
- Demolished: 2004

Tenants
- FC Wacker Innsbruck, FC Swarovski Tirol, FC Tirol Innsbruck

Tivoli was a multi-use stadium in Innsbruck, Austria. It was used mostly for football matches and hosted the home matches of FC Wacker Innsbruck, FC Swarovski Tirol and FC Tirol Innsbruck. The stadium was able to hold 15,922 people. It was demolished in 2004, four years after Tivoli Neu opened.

== History ==
The site of the original Tivoli Stadion was acquired by the City of Innsbruck in 1904 for recreational and agricultural purposes. Construction of a sports ground began in 1922, featuring a football pitch, running track, grandstands and supporting facilities, adjacent to the Sill River. During the World War II, the complex was heavily damaged by Allied bombing, and the site was temporarily used for agriculture in the immediate post-war years.

Reconstruction began in the late 1940s, using rubble from bomb-damaged buildings in Innsbruck. The stadium opened on 2 August 1953 with a 5–1 victory for SK Rapid Wien over Nîmes Olympique and became the home of FC Wacker Innsbruck, hosting many of the club's greatest successes.

Following the completion of the nearby Tivoli Stadion Tirol in 2000, the original stadium, by then known as the "Tirol Milch Stadion am Tivoli" for sponsorship reasons, was closed. The site was subsequently redeveloped for residential housing in 2004.

== Gallery ==
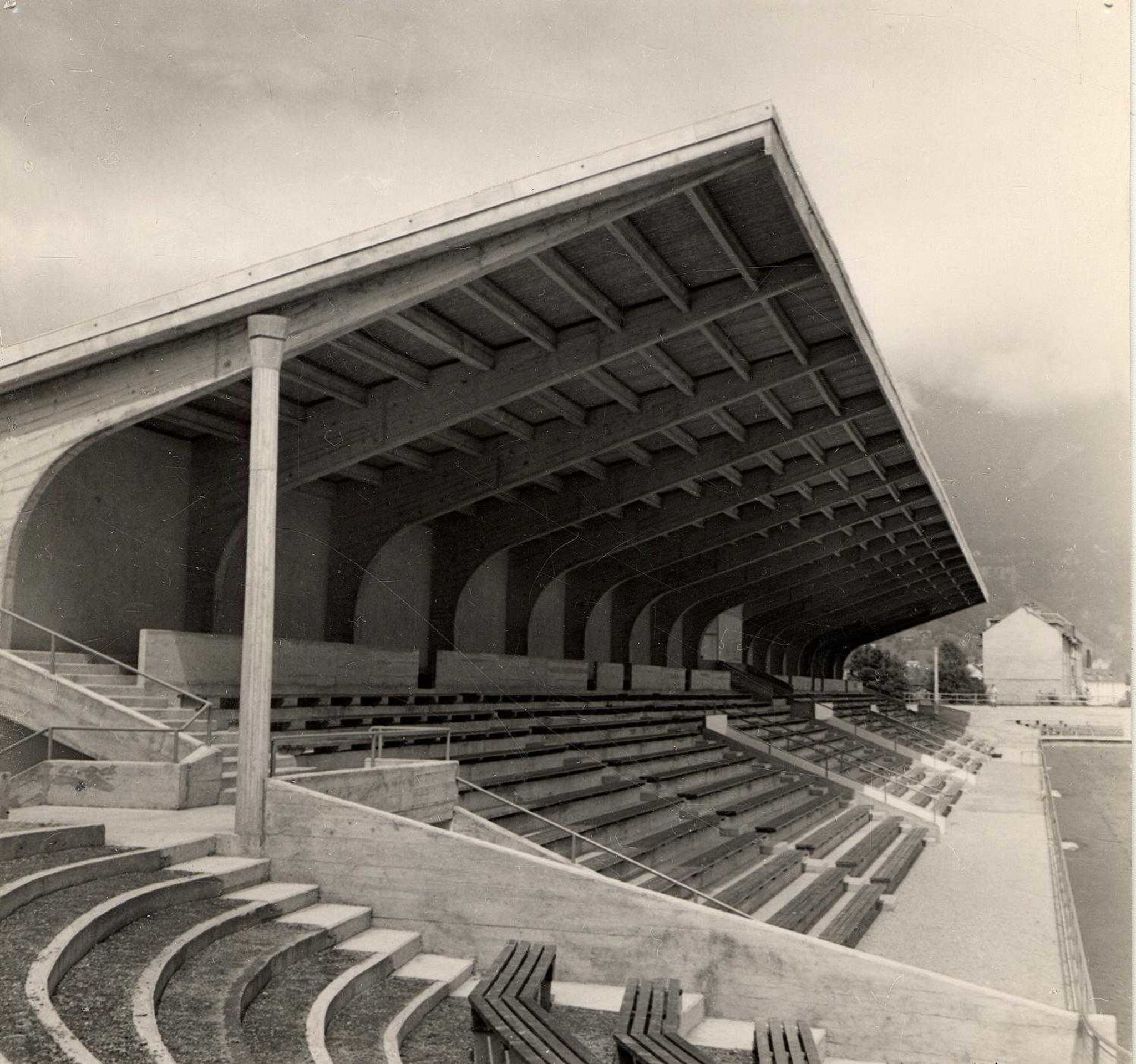
North stand of the original Tivoli Stadion

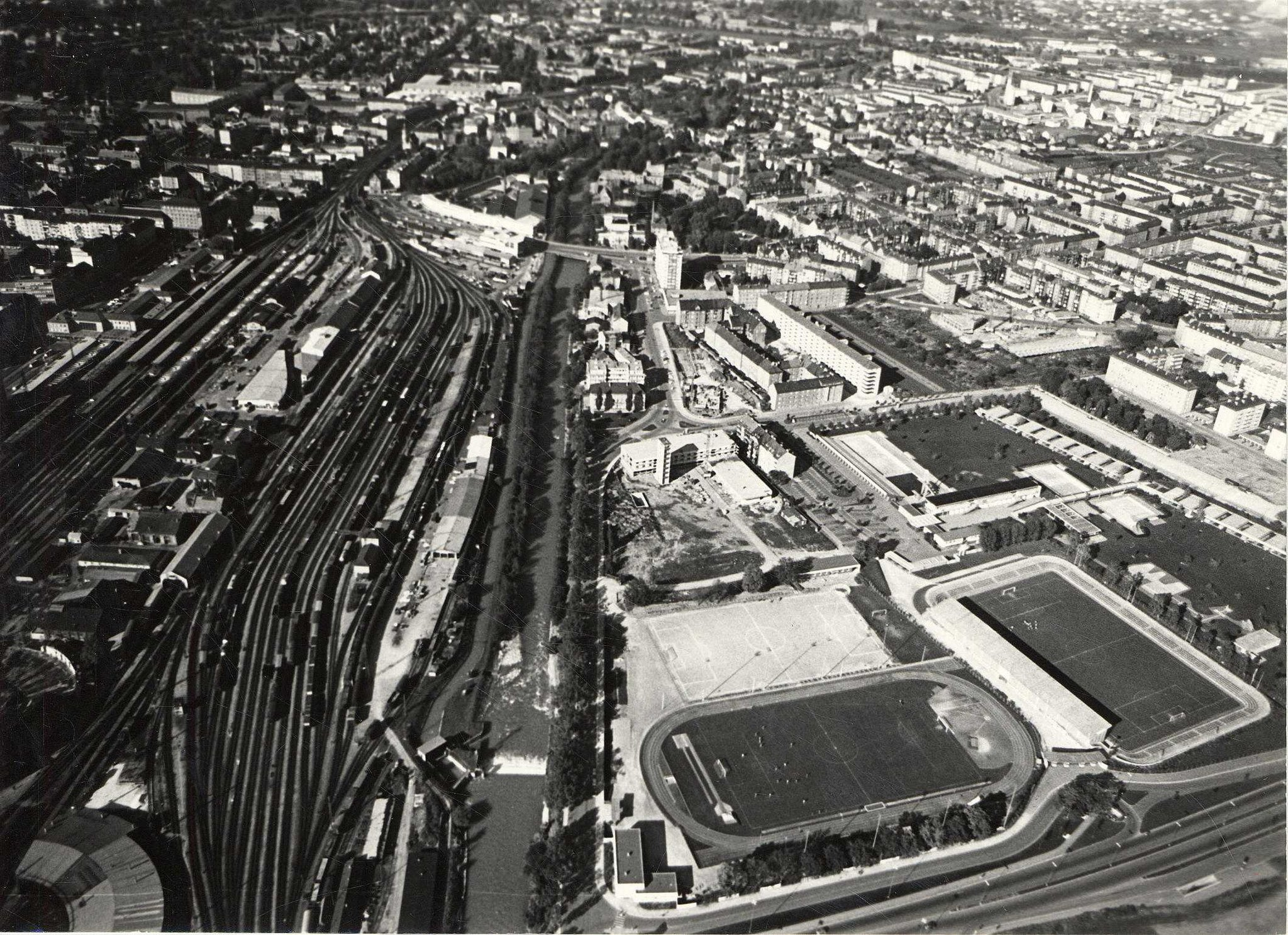
Aerial view of the original Tivoli Stadion
