= Datenpol Arena =

Multi-use stadium in Maria Enzersdorf, Austria

Coordinates: 48°05′51″N 16°18′39″E

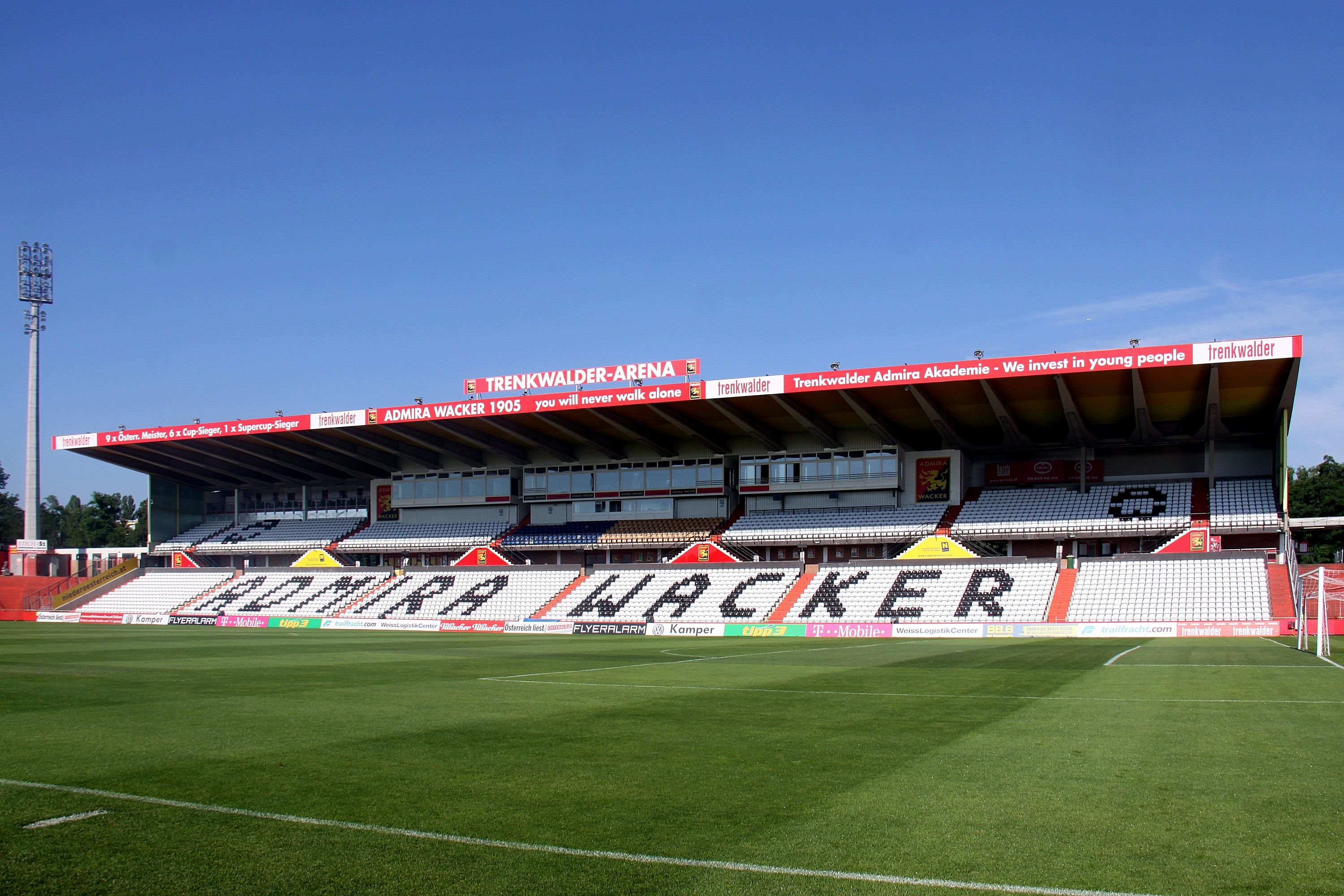
- Bundesstadion Südstadt
- Interactive map of Datenpol Arena
- Former names: Bundesstadion Südstadt (1967–2008); Trenkwalder-Arena (2008–2013); BSFZ-Arena (2013–2022) motion_invest Arena (2022–2023)
- Owner: Bundessporteinrichtungen GesmbH
- Capacity: 10,600
- Surface: Grass
- Field size: 105 × 64 m

Construction
- Groundbreaking: 1965
- Opened: 4 March 1967

Tenant
- FC Admira Wacker Mödling

The Datenpol Arena (formerly motion_invest Arena, BSFZ-Arena, Bundesstadion Südstadt) is a multi-use stadium in Maria Enzersdorf - Südstadt, Austria (Johann Steinböck-Straße). It is currently used mostly for football matches and is the home ground of VfB Admira Wacker Mödling. The stadium holds 10,600.
