= Egon Pajenk =

Austrian footballer (1950–2022)

Personal information
- Date of birth: 23 July 1950
- Place of birth: Fohnsdorf, Austria
- Date of death: 19 August 2022 (aged 72)
- Place of death: Fohnsdorf, Austria
- Height: 1.91 m (6 ft 3 in)
- Position: Defender

Senior career*
Years	Team	Apps	(Gls)
–1970	WSV Fohnsdorf		
1970–1979	Rapid Wien	266	(17)
1979–1980	Admira/Wacker		
1980–1981	SPG Innsbruck		

International career
1974–1975	Austria	3	(0)
- * Club domestic league appearances and goals

Egon Pajenk (23 July 1950 – 19 August 2022) was an Austrian footballer who played as a defender. He died on 19 August 2022, at the age of 72.
