= FC Stahl Linz (2013) =

- Full name: Fußball-Club Stahl Linz
- Founded: 1946; 80 years ago 2013; 13 years ago (refounded)
- Dissolved: 1997; 29 years ago
- Ground: ASKÖ Neue Heimat
- League: 2. Klasse Mitte

FC Stahl Linz is an Austrian football club, based in Linz, Upper Austria. They currently play in 2. Klasse Mitte, the eighth tier of Austrian football.

== History ==
=== SV Eisen und Stahl, SK VÖEST Linz and SK VOEST Linz ===
It was founded on 30 June 1946 as SV Eisen und Stahl 1946 Linz, a factory squad of the public VÖEST steel company (present-day Voestalpine). In 1949, the team was renamed SK VÖEST Linz.

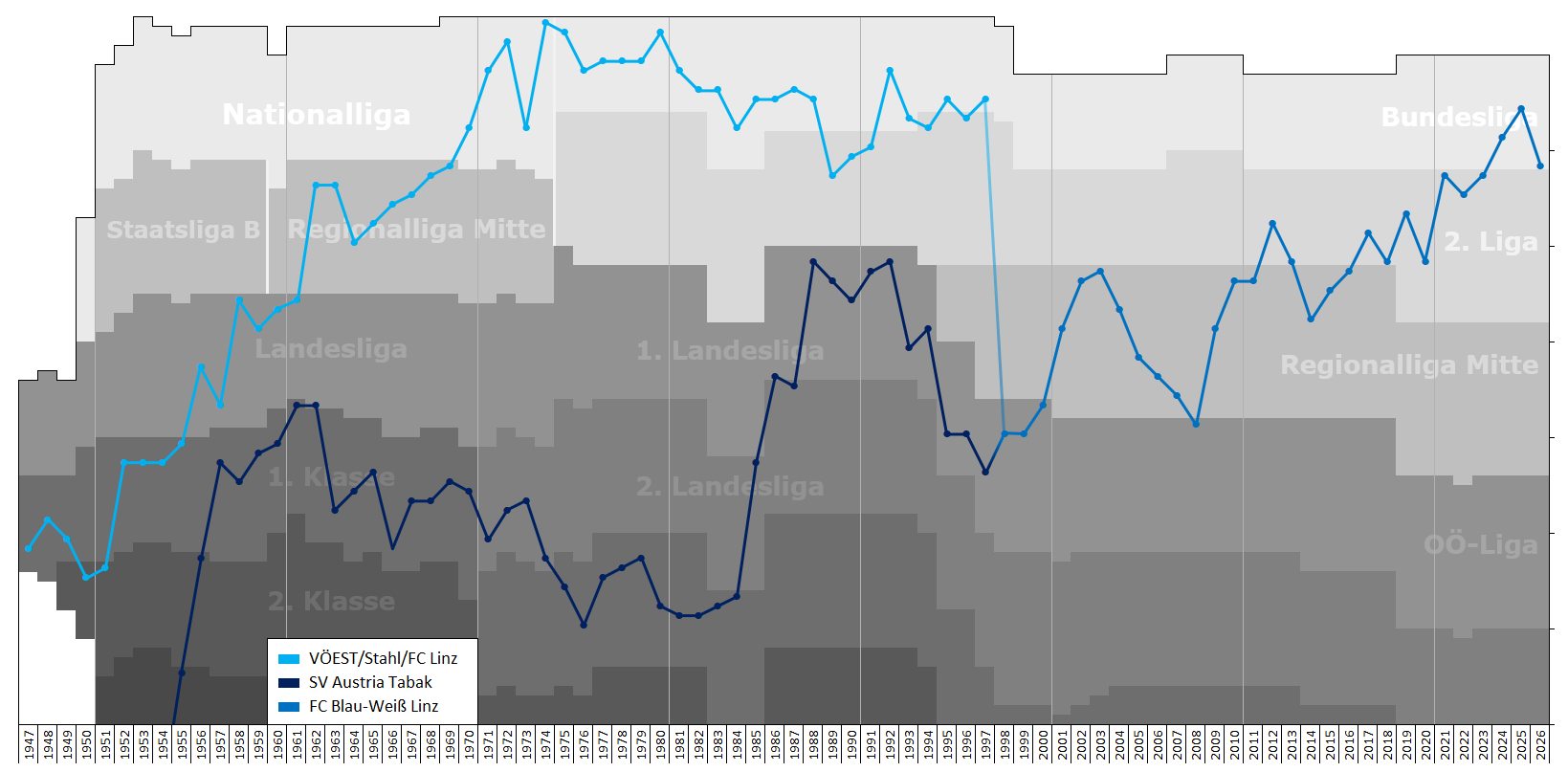
Historical chart of league performance of FC Linz and their successor Blau-Weiß Linz

In 1969, SK VÖEST won the championship of the Regional League Central and was promoted to the Nationalliga, the predecessor of the Bundesliga. In the summer of 1972, the club colors were changed from black and white to blue and white to distinguish themselves from city rivals LASK. The club reached its peak in the 1973–74 season, when they became Austrian champion. Its decline began in 1988, when SK VOEST (without umlaut since 1978) was relegated to the First League (II).

=== FC VOEST Linz, FC Stahl Linz and FC Linz ===
While the club managed re-entry into the Bundesliga in 1991, the steel company withdrew funds and the team was again renamed, as FC Stahl Linz in 1991 and FC Linz in 1993. In 1997, due to financial difficulties, the club finally had to dissolve, by merger with its long-time rival LASK.

=== FC Blau Weiß Linz ===
In the same year, FC Blau-Weiß Linz was founded by former FC Linz fans, which took over the traditions of the disbanded club, but is not the official successor club of FC Linz. Blau Weiß Linz was promoted to the Austrian Bundesliga 26 years after its foundation, in 2023. They will play in the highest Austrian football league for the first time in the 2023–24 season.

=== FC Stahl Linz (2013) ===
Since 2013, a new FC Stahl Linz has been formed from the SK VÖEST company football section. This club has been playing as an independent club in the lower Upper Austrian amateur leagues since the 2014–15 season and, according to the Austrian Football Bundesliga, is the official successor club to FC Linz, which was dissolved in 1997. FC Stahl Linz currently (as of before the 2023–24 season) plays in the 2. Klasse Mitte (8th division in Austria and 5th division in Upper Austria).

== Achievements ==
- Bundesliga
  - Champions (1): 1974
  - Runners-up (2): 1975, 1980
- Austrian Cup
  - Runners-up (2): 1978, 1994
- First League
  - Champions (2): 1991, 1996
- Regional League Central
  - Champions (1): 1969

== European Cup history ==
| Season | Competition | Round | Country | Club | Results |
|---|---|---|---|---|---|
| 1972–73 | UEFA Cup | 1R | (East Germany) | Dynamo Dresden | 0–2 (A), 2–2 (H) |
| 1974–75 | European Champion's Cup | 1R | (Francoist Spain) | FC Barcelona | 0–0 (H), 0–5 (A) |
| 1975–76 | UEFA Cup | 1R | (Hungary) | Budapest Vasas SC | 2–0 (H), 0–4 (A) |
| 1980–81 | UEFA Cup | 1R | (Czechoslovakia) | TJ Zbrojovka Brno | 1–3 (A), 0–2 (H) |

== Crests ==
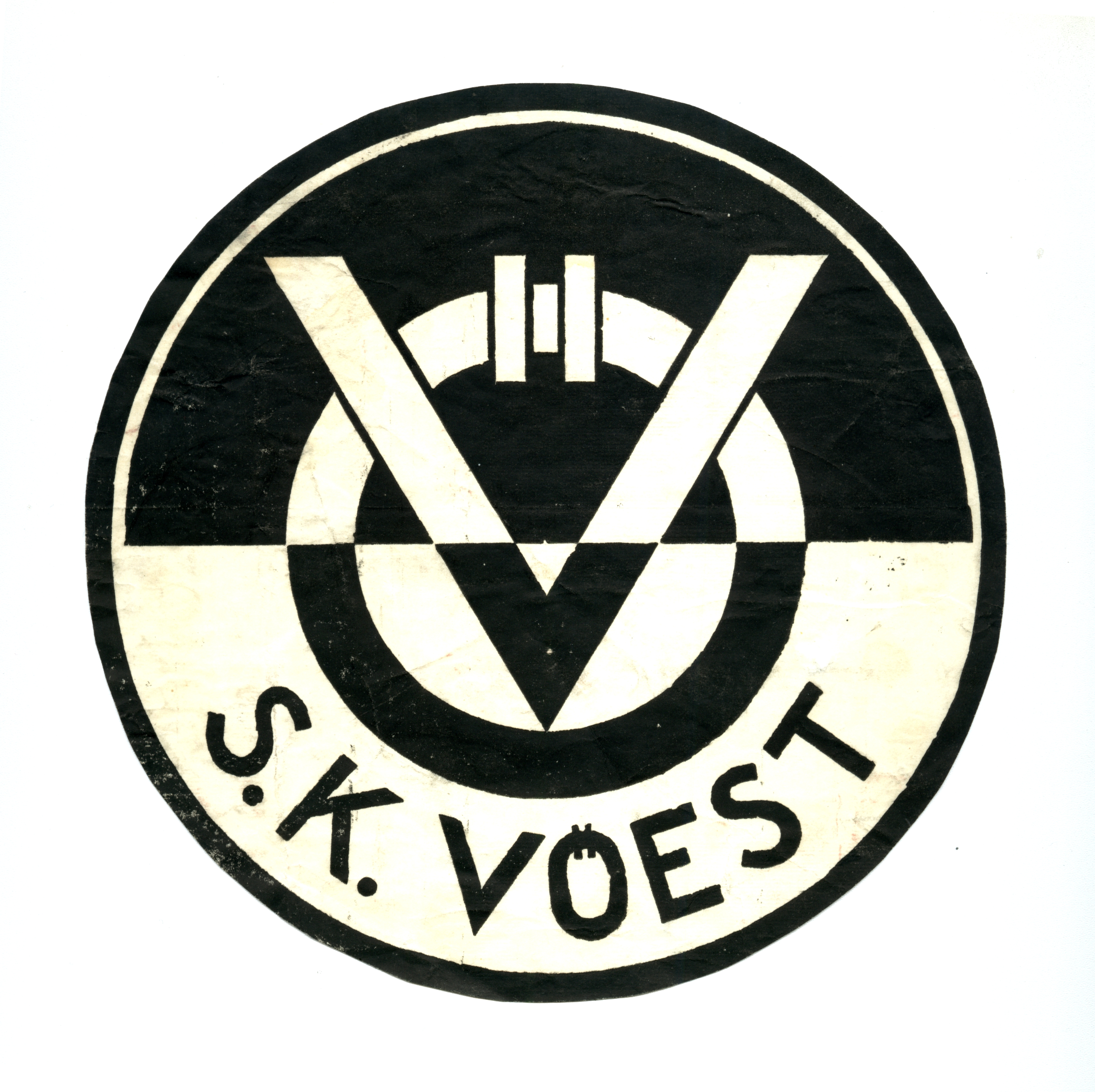
Crest of SK VÖEST Linz from the founding period in black and white – black and white were the club colors until the summer of 1972

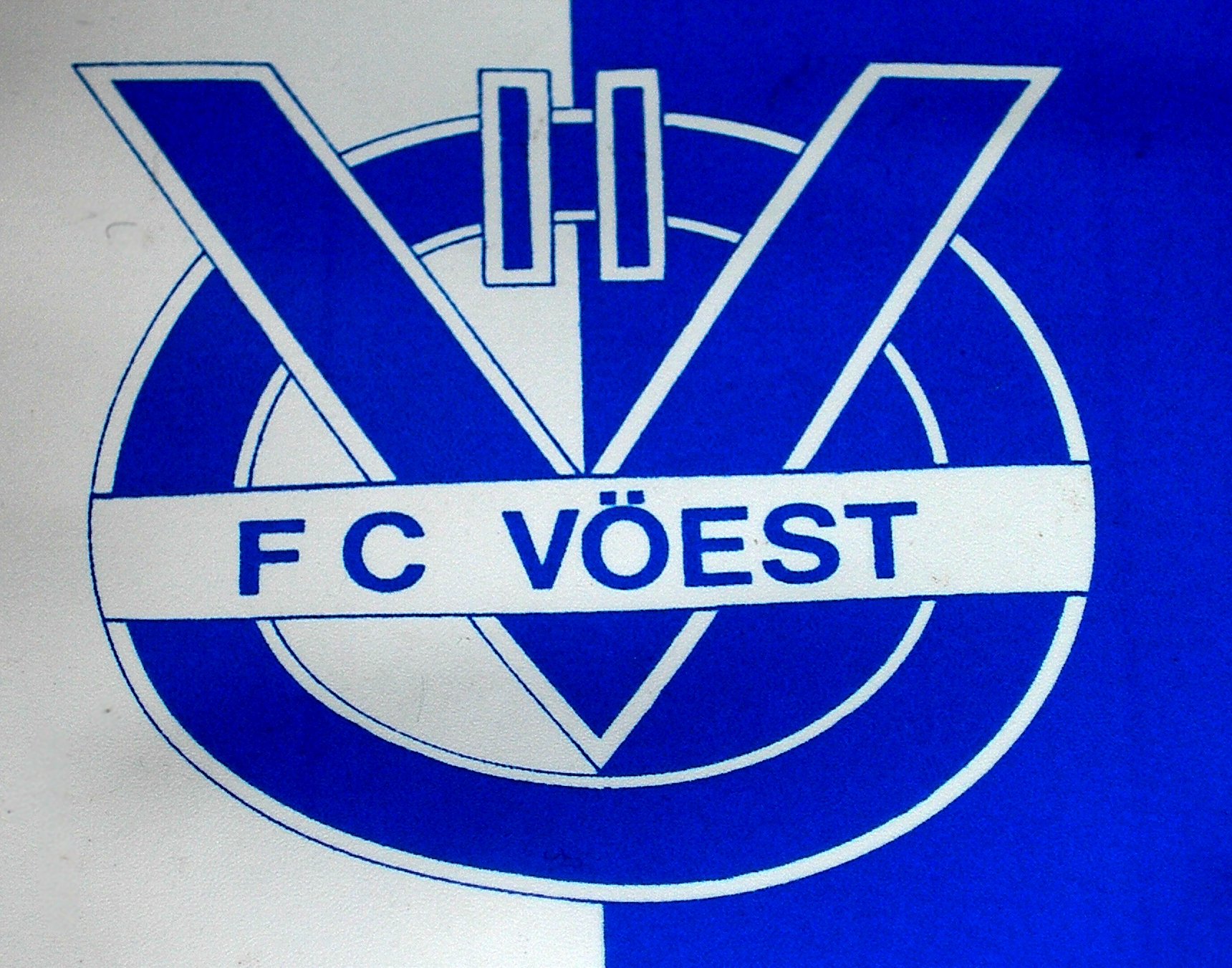
Crest of FC VOEST Linz (season 1990–91)

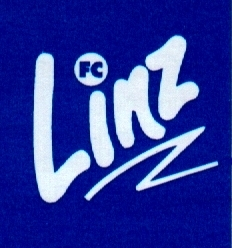
Crest of FC Linz (1993)

2013 re-established as FC Stahl Linz (amateur club)
