= 1977–78 FK Austria Wien season =

Austria Wien
1977-78 season
- Manager: Hermann Stessl
- Stadium: Franz Horr Stadium
- Bundesliga: 1st
- ÖFB-Cup: Semi-finals
- Cup Winners' Cup: Runners-up
- Top goalscorer: League: Hans Pirkner (20 goals); All: Hans Pirkner (24 goals)
- Average home league attendance: 6,036
- Biggest win: 6–0 v. Wiener Sport-Club (H); 19 February 1978
- Biggest defeat: 0-4 v. Anderlecht (A); 3 May 1978

In the 1977-78 season, Austria Wien won the Bundesliga with 56 points, 14 more than their rivals Rapid Wien. They reached the semi-finals of the Austrian Cup, losing 2-0 to eventual cup winners SSW Innsbruck. In the Cup Winners' Cup, they defeated Cardiff City, Lokomotíva Košice, Hajduk Split and Dynamo Moscow, and faced Anderlecht in the finals, losing 4-0 to the Belgian club.

== Squad ==
Note: Flags indicate national team as defined under FIFA eligibility rules; some limited exceptions apply. Players may hold more than one non-FIFA nationality.

No.	Pos.	Nation	Player
—	GK	AUT	Hubert Baumgartner
—	GK	AUT	Hannes Weninger
—	DF	AUT	Erich Obermayer
—	DF	AUT	Josef Sara
—	DF	AUT	Robert Sara
—	MF	AUT	Ernst Baumeister
—	MF	AUT	Karl Daxbacher
—	MF	AUT	Friedrich Drazan
—	MF	AUT	Felix Gasselich
—	MF	AUT	Günther Pospischil
—	MF	AUT	Herbert Prohaska
—	MF	AUT	Franz Viertl

No.	Pos.	Nation	Player
—	FW	URU	Alberto Martínez
—	FW	URU	Julio Morales
—	FW	AUT	Thomas Parits
—	FW	AUT	Hans Pirkner
—	FW	AUT	Wilhelm Pöll
—	FW	AUT	Alfred Roscher
—	FW	AUT	Franz Weiss
—	FW	AUT	Franz Zach

== Competitions ==
=== Overall record ===
Competition	First match	Last match	Starting round	Final position	Record							
Competition	First match	Last match	Starting round	Final position	Pld	W	D	L	GF	GA	GD	Win %
Bundesliga	11 August 1977	6 May 1978	Matchday 1	Winners	36	23	10	3	77	34	+43	63.89
Austrian Cup	8 December 1977	19 April 1978	Second round	Semi-finals	4	3	0	1	14	5	+9	75.00
Cup Winners' Cup	14 September 1977	3 May 1978	First round	Runners-up	9	3	4	2	5	10	−5	33.33
Total					49	29	14	6	96	49	+47	59.18

Source: Competitions

=== Bundesliga ===
==== League table ====
Pos	Team	Pld	W	D	L	GF	GA	GD	Pts	Qualification or relegation
1	FK Austria Wien	36	23	10	3	77	34	+43	56	Qualification to European Cup first round
2	SK Rapid Wien	36	16	10	10	76	43	+33	42	Qualification to UEFA Cup first round
3	FC Wacker Innsbruck	36	15	9	12	49	34	+15	39	Qualification to Cup Winners' Cup first round
4	SK Sturm Graz	36	13	12	11	51	54	−3	38	Qualification to UEFA Cup first round
5	VÖEST Linz	36	10	13	13	45	49	−4	33	

Source: bundesliga.at
Rules for classification: 1) points; 2) goal difference; 3) number of goals scored.

===== Matches =====
11 August 1977 1	Austria Wien	2-1	LASK Linz	Weststadion, Vienna
19:00	Parits 46', 60'		Köglberger 63'	Attendance: 5,000; Referee: Wilhelm Jarosch

16 August 1977 2	Grazer AK	0-3	Austria Wien	Stadion Liebenau, Graz
19:00			Morales 13'; Baumeister 82'; Parits 87'	Attendance: 6,000; Referee: Horst Brummeier

26 August 1977 3	Austria Wien	5-3	First Vienna	Weststadion, Vienna
19:00	Pirkner 43' (pen.), 55', 73'; Parits 52'; Drazan 86'		Perischa 38' (pen.); Poindl 57'; Caha 57'	Attendance: 7,500; Referee: Franz Wöhrer

30 August 1977 4	SSW Innsbruck	1-1	Austria Wien	Tivoli Stadion, Innsbruck
19:00	Weninger 75' (pen.)		Pirkner 34'	Attendance: 16,000; Referee: Adolf Mathias

2 September 1977 5	Austria Wien	1-1	VÖEST Linz	Weststadion, Vienna
19:00	Gasselich 35'		Roßkogler 59'	Attendance: 4,500; Referee: Rupert Rück

6 September 1977 6	Sturm Graz	3-1	Austria Wien	Stadion Liebenau, Graz
19:00	Kulmer 28'; Haas 47', 76'		Obermayer 57'	Attendance: 11,000; Referee: Werner Spiegl

9 September 1977 7	Austria Wien	0-0	Wiener Sport-Club	Weststadion, Vienna
19:00				Attendance: 9,500; Referee: Adolf Mathias

30 September 1977 8	Admira Wacker	3-4	Austria Wien	Bundesstadion, Maria Enzersdorf
19:00	Gassner 39'; Demantke 56', 83'		Pirkner 27'; Sara 35'; Gasselich 36'; Daxbacher 72'	Attendance: 3,000; Referee: Johann Swoboda

4 October 1977 9	Austria Wien	3-2	Rapid Wien	Weststadion, Vienna
19:00	Daxbacher 9'; Morales 14', 42'		Krauss 62'; Pajenk 86'	Attendance: 11,500; Referee: Erich Linemayr

15 October 1977 10	LASK Linz	0-3	Austria Wien	Linzer Stadion, Linz
15:00			Daxbacher 65'; Drazan 76'; Prohaska 85'	Attendance: 5,500; Referee: Wolfgang Klocker

22 October 1977 11	Austria Wien	3-0	Grazer AK	Weststadion, Vienna
15:00	Parits 9', 59'; Martínez 65'			Attendance: 1,740; Referee: Dr. Josef Hager

5 November 1977 12	First Vienna	1-2	Austria Wien	Hohe Warte Stadium, Vienna
14:30	Caha 40'		Prohaska 58'; Parits 83' (pen.)	Attendance: 6,000; Referee: Heinz Fahnler

8 November 1977 13	Austria Wien	1-0	SSW Innsbruck	Praterstadion, Vienna
19:00	Parits 54'			Attendance: 12,000; Referee: Wilhelm Jarosch

12 November 1977 14	VÖEST Linz	1-1	Austria Wien	Linzer Stadion, Linz
15:00	Hintermaier 17'		Prohaska 57'	Attendance: 3,500; Referee: Siegfried Goriupp

20 November 1977 15	Austria Wien	3-1	Sturm Graz	Franz Horr Stadium, Vienna
10:30	Parits 18', 66'; Pirkner 27'		Jurtin 29' (pen.)	Attendance: 8,000; Referee: Gerald Losert

27 November 1977 16	Wiener Sport-Club	0-0	Austria Wien	Sportclub-Platz, Vienna
10:30				Attendance: 5,500; Referee: Franz Wöhrer

4 December 1977 17	Austria Wien	3-1	Admira Wacker	Franz Horr Stadium, Vienna
10:30	Parits 55'; Morales 61'; Pirkner 80'		Cerny 5'	Attendance: 4,000; Referee: Eduard Malik

11 December 1977 18	Rapid Wien	0-1	Austria Wien	Praterstadion, Vienna
14:00			Pirkner 47'	Attendance: 5,000; Referee: Adolf Mathias

18 December 1977 19	Austria Wien	1-0	LASK Linz	Franz Horr Stadium, Vienna
10:30	Gasselich 74'			Attendance: 3,000; Referee: Dr. Josef Hager

14 January 1978 20	Grazer AK	2-1	Austria Wien	Stadion Liebenau, Graz
14:30	Schneider 47'; Weiss 68'		Prohaska 25'	Attendance: 2,000; Referee: Horst Brummeier

22 January 1978 21	Austria Wien	3-1	First Vienna	Franz Horr Stadium, Vienna
10:30	Gasselich 39'; Pirkner 53', 89'		Caha 53'	Attendance: 2,400; Referee: Fritz Schachhuber

5 February 1978 23	Austria Wien	2-0	VÖEST Linz	Franz Horr Stadium, Vienna
14:30	Parits 3'; Gasselich 58'			Attendance: 2,000; Referee: Günther Bind

7 February 1978 22	SSW Innsbruck	1-2	Austria Wien	Franz Horr Stadium, Vienna
14:00	Schwartz 6'		Pirkner 9'; Martínez 85'	Attendance: 1,500; Referee: Wilhelm Jarosch

10 February 1978 24	Sturm Graz	1-1	Austria Wien	Stadion Liebenau, Graz
19:00	Wirth 20'		Martínez 64'	Attendance: 2,500; Referee: Adolf Mathias

19 February 1978 25	Austria Wien	6-0	Wiener Sport-Club	Franz Horr Stadium, Vienna
10:30	Pirkner 18', 25', 58'; Parits 61', 90'; Morales 89'			Attendance: 2,300; Referee: Horst Brummeier

25 February 1978 26	Admira Wacker	1-1	Austria Wien	Bundesstadion, Maria Enzersdorf
15:00	Gassner 9'		Morales 14'	Attendance: 3,500; Referee: Freidoun Nehuray

5 March 1978 27	Austria Wien	3-0	Rapid Wien	Praterstadion, Vienna
10:15	Pirkner 61' (pen.), 82' (pen.); Gasselich 78'			Attendance: 15,000; Referee: Heinz Fahnler

11 March 1978 28	LASK Linz	0-2	Austria Wien	Linzer Stadion, Vienna
15:30			Pirkner 50'; Morales 90'	Attendance: 1,700; Referee: Franz Latzin

19 March 1978 29	Austria Wien	3-1	Grazer AK	Franz Horr Stadium, Vienna
10:30	Prohaska 23'; Gasselich 63'; Parits 76'		Zuenelli 70'	Attendance: 4,000; Referee: Alfred Höller

25 March 1978 30	First Vienna	2-1	Austria Wien	Hohe Warte Stadium, Vienna
16:00	Zimmermann 2'; Rieß 65'		Martínez 44'	Attendance: 4,000; Referee: Alfons Jungwirth

1 April 1978 31	Austria Wien	1-1	SSW Innsbruck	Praterstadion, Vienna
16:00	Auer 25' (o.g.)		Koncilia 5'	Attendance: 6,500; Referee: Johann Swoboda

7 April 1978 32	VÖEST Linz	1-1	Austria Wien	Linzer Stadion, Linz
18:30	Pöll 25'		Baumeister 68'	Attendance: 2,000; Referee: Wilhelm Jarosch

16 April 1978 33	Austria Wien	6-1	Sturm Graz	Franz Horr Stadium, Vienna
10:30	Sara 12', 65'; Baumeister 21'; Pirkner 26', 60'; Martínez 70'		Kulmer 36'	Attendance: 5,000; Referee: Wolfgang Klocker

21 April 1978 34	Wiener Sport-Club	2-3	Austria Wien	Sportclub-Plaza, Vienna
19:00	Zechner 20'; Hengster 84'		Obermayer 61'; Prohaska 71'; Gasselich 85'	Attendance: 6,000; Referee: Heinz Fahnler

29 April 1978 35	Austria Wien	3-2	Admira Wacker	Franz Horr Stadium, Vienna
16:30	Pirkner 30' (pen.); Gasselich 38'; Prohaska 81'		Bartosche 43'; Cerny 59'	Attendance: 4,700; Referee: Erich Linemayr

6 May 1978 36	Rapid Wien	0-0	Austria Wien	Praterstadion, Vienna
17:00				Attendance: 13,125; Referee: Josef Bucek

=== ÖFB-Cup ===
8 December 1977 Second round	Wiener Neustädter	1-2	Austria Wien	Stadion Wiener Neustadt, Wiener Neustadt
13:30	Weninger 8'		Parits 15'; Daxbacher 61'	Attendance: 2,000; Referee: Rupert Rück

26 December 1977 Third round	Austria Wien	5-0	Admira/Wacker	Franz Horr Stadium, Vienna
10:30	Parits 24'; Pirkner 25', 85'; Prohaska 28'; Obermayer 62'			Attendance: 3,000; Referee: Alfons Jungwirth

8 March 1978 Quarter-final	St. Veit	2-4	Austria Wien	SV-Stadion Prinzhoferstraße, Sankt Veit an der Glan
14:45	Golautschnig 6'; Türk 71'		Gasselich 9'; Prohaska 30'; Pirkner 40'; Daxbacher 50'	Attendance: 2,500; Referee: Herbert Loidl

19 April 1978 Semi-final	SSW Innsbruck	2-0	Austria Wien	Tivoli Stadion, Innsbruck
19:30	Pezzey 30'; Koncilia 56'			Attendance: 12,000; Referee: Erich Linemayr

=== Cup Winners' Cup ===
==== First round ====
14 September 1977 First leg	Cardiff City (Wales)	0-0	Austria Wien	Ninian Park, Cardiff
18:00				Attendance: 3,631; Referee: Ulf Eriksson (Sweden)

28 September 1977 Second leg	Austria Wien	1-0	(Wales) Cardiff City	Weststadion, Vienna
19:15	Baumeister 53'			Attendance: 8,000; Referee: Marian Kuston (Poland)

==== Second round ====
19 October 1977 First leg	Austria Wien	0-0	(Czech Republic) Lokomotiva Košice	Weststadion, Vienna
19:30				Attendance: 8,500; Referee: Nikola Dudin (Bulgaria)

2 November 1977 Second leg	Lokomotíva Košice (Czech Republic)	1-1	Austria Wien	Štadión Lokomotívy, Košice
16:00	Farkaš 51' (pen.)		Morales 69'	Attendance: 15,000; Referee: Georges Konrath (France)

==== Quarter-final ====
2 March 1978 First leg	Austria Wien	1–1	(Socialist Federal Republic of Yugoslavia) Hajduk Split	Weststadion, Vienna
19:00	Parits 61'		Šurjak 65'	Attendance: 13,000; Referee: Sergio Gonella (Italy)

15 March 1978 Second leg	Hajduk Split (Socialist Federal Republic of Yugoslavia)	1–1 (a.e.t.) (1–4 p)	Austria Wien	Stadion Poljud, Split
16:30	Čop 20'		Daxbacher 56'	Attendance: 25,000; Referee: Ferdinand Biwersi (West Germany)

==== Semi-final ====
29 March 1978 First leg	Dynamo Moscow (Soviet Union)	2-1	Austria Wien	Central Dynamo Stadium, Moscow
16:00	Tsereteli 84'; Gershkovich 86'		Baumeister 26'	Attendance: 60,000; Referee: Doğan Babacan (Turkey)

12 April 1978 Second leg	Austria Wien	2–1 (5–4 p)	(Soviet Union) Dynamo Moscow	Praterstadion, Vienna
19:30	Pirkner 49' (pen.); Morales 56'		Yakubik 90'	Attendance: 72,000; Referee: António Garrido (Portugal)
	Penalties
	Parits (penalty scored); Pirkner (penalty scored); Prohaska (penalty scored); Morales (penalty scored); Martínez (penalty scored)		(penalty scored) Kazachyonok; (penalty scored) Maksimenkov; (penalty scored) Tsereteli; (penalty scored) Yakubik; (penalty missed) Bubnov

==== Final ====
3 May 1978 Final	Anderlecht (Belgium)	4-0	Austria Wien	Parc des Princes, Paris
	Rensenbrink 13', 44'; Van Binst 45', 82'			Attendance: 48,679; Referee: Heinz Aldinger (West Germany)
