= 1978–79 FK Austria Wien season =

Austria Wien
1978-79 season
- Manager: Hermann Stessl
- Stadium: Franz Horr Stadium
- Bundesliga: 1st
- ÖFB-Cup: Second round
- European Cup: Semi-finals
- Top goalscorer: League: Walter Schachner (24 goals); All: Walter Schachner (29 goals)
- Average home league attendance: 7,390
- Biggest win: 5–1 v. SK Rapid Wien (H); 22 October 1978
- Biggest defeat: 0-4 v. FC Wacker Innsbruck (A); 23 September 1978

During the 1978–79 season, Austria Wien participated in the Austrian Football Bundesliga, winning the title with 55 points. In the European Cup, they defeated KF Vllaznia, Lillestrøm SK, Dynamo Dresden, only to lose to Malmö FF in the semi-finals. They were eliminated by Vorwärts Steyr in the second round of the Austrian Cup.

== Squad ==
Note: Flags indicate national team as defined under FIFA eligibility rules; some limited exceptions apply. Players may hold more than one non-FIFA nationality.

No.	Pos.	Nation	Player
—	GK	AUT	Hubert Baumgartner
—	GK	AUT	Erich Weidenauer
—	GK	AUT	Hannes Weninger
—	DF	AUT	Hans Dihanich
—	DF	AUT	Harald Gamauf
—	DF	AUT	Erich Obermayer
—	DF	AUT	Josef Sara
—	DF	AUT	Robert Sara
—	DF	AUT	Franz Zore
—	MF	AUT	Siegfried Aigner
—	MF	AUT	Ernst Baumeister
—	MF	AUT	Karl Daxbacher
—	MF	AUT	Harald Fürst
—	MF	AUT	Felix Gasselich
—	MF	AUT	Günther Pospischil
—	MF	AUT	Herbert Prohaska
—	MF	AUT	Franz Viertl

No.	Pos.	Nation	Player
—	FW	AUT	Friedrich Borgan
—	FW	AUT	Erwin Jelinek
—	FW	AUT	Thomas Parits
—	FW	AUT	Thomas Pfeiler
—	FW	AUT	Walter Schachner
—	FW	URU	Carlos Sintas
—	FW	AUT	Franz Weiss
—	FW	AUT	Franz Zach

== Competitions ==
=== Overall record ===
Competition	First match	Last match	Starting round	Final position	Record							
Competition	First match	Last match	Starting round	Final position	Pld	W	D	L	GF	GA	GD	Win %
Bundesliga	18 August 1978	22 June 1979	Matchday 1	Winners	36	25	5	6	88	44	+44	69.44
Austrian Cup	15 August 1978	15 August 1978	Second round	Second round	1	0	0	1	1	3	−2	0.00
European Cup	13 September 1978	25 April 1979	First round	Semi-finals	8	3	2	3	11	7	+4	37.50
Total					45	28	7	10	100	54	+46	62.22

Source: Competitions

=== Bundesliga ===
==== League table ====
Pos	Team	Pld	W	D	L	GF	GA	GD	Pts	Qualification or relegation
1	FK Austria Wien	36	25	5	6	88	44	+44	55	Qualification to European Cup first round
2	Wiener Sportclub	36	15	11	10	71	54	+17	41	Qualification to UEFA Cup first round
3	SK Rapid Wien	36	13	13	10	52	42	+10	39	Qualification to UEFA Cup first round
4	SK Sturm Graz	36	14	9	13	43	50	−7	37	
5	VÖEST Linz	36	11	14	11	41	44	−3	36	

Source: bundesliga.at
Rules for classification: 1) points; 2) goal difference; 3) number of goals scored.

==== Matches ====
18 August 1978 1	Rapid Wien	3-1	Austria Wien	Weststadion, Vienna
20:00	Happich 5' (pen.); Francker 15'; Krauss 71'		Parits 60' (pen.)	Attendance: 20,000; Referee: Franz Wöhrer

25 August 1978 2	Austria Wien	1-3	VÖEST Linz	Franz Horr Stadium, Vienna
16:30	Prohaska 21'		Horvath 14' (o.g.); Baumeister 19' (o.g.); Kreuz 86' (pen.)	Attendance: 7,000; Referee: Franz Latzin

2 September 1978 3	Admira Wacker	1-1	Austria Wien	Bundestadion, Vienna
17:00	Strasser 23' (pen.)		Prohaska 47' (pen.)	Attendance: 8,000; Referee: Heinz Fahnler

9 September 1978 4	Austria Wien	3-1	Wiener Sport-Club	Praterstadion, Vienna
14:30	Parits 12'; Schachner 28', 73'		Demel 37'	Attendance: 15,000; Referee: Erich Linemayr

16 September 1978 5	Sturm Graz	0-3	Austria Wien	Liebenau Stadion, Graz
19:00			Wirth 84' (o.g.); Schachner 88'; Baumeister 90'	Attendance: 8,000; Referee: Dr. Josef Hager

23 September 1978 6	SSW Innsbruck	4-0	Austria Wien	Tivoli Stadion, Innsbruck
16:00	Hanschitz 17', 25'; Oberacher 20'; Koncilia 81'			Attendance: 9,000; Referee: Rupert Rück

1 October 1978 7	Austria Vienna	4-1	Austria Salzburg	Franz Horr Stadium, Vienna
10:15	Baumeister 7'; Pospischil 25'; Pirnus 57' (o.g.); Schachner 79'		Kodat 65'	Attendance: 6,500; Referee: Horst Brummeier

7 October 1978 8	First Vienna	1-3	Austria Wien	Hohe Warte Stadium, Vienna
15:30	Pirkner 88'		Parits 4' (pen.); Sara 15'; Schachner 54'	Attendance: 10,000; Referee: Wilhelm Jarosch

13 October 1978 9	Austria Wien	4-1	Grazer AK	Franz Horr Stadium, Vienna
15:30	Prohaska 26'; Sintas 41'; Baumeister 54'; Parits 78'		Zuenelli 85' (pen.)	Attendance: 7,200; Referee: Gerald Losert

22 October 1978 10	Austria Wien	5-1	Rapid Wien	Praterstadion, Vienna
10:30	Parits 6', 20', 33' (pen.); Schachner 37', 58'		Kirisits 74'	Attendance: 22,000; Referee: Wolfgang Klocker

28 October 1978 11	VÖEST Linz	1-2	Austria Wien	Linzer Stadion, Linz
15:00	Schill 23'		Schachner 65'; Parits 70'	Attendance: 25,000; Referee: Wilhelm Jarosch

5 November 1978 12	Austria Wien	1-0	Admira/Wacker	Praterstadion, Vienna
10:30	Parits 85'			Attendance: 8,000; Referee: Alfred Höller

10 November 1978 13	Wiener Sport-Club	1-3	Austria Wien	Wiener Sport-Club Platz, Vienna
17:00	Starek 48' (pen.)		Prohaska 12'; Parits 65' (pen.), 77' (pen.)	Attendance: 8,500; Referee: Franz Wöhrer

19 November 1979 14	Austria Wien	4-1	Sturm Graz	Praterstadion, Vienna
10:30	Schachner 13', 14'; Parits 46' (pen.); Gasselich 79'		Jurtin 48'	Attendance: 4,500; Referee: Herbert Loidl

25 November 1978 15	Austria Wien	3-0	SSW Innsbruck	Praterstadion, Vienna
14:00	Parits 36' (pen.), 43' (pen.); Daxbacher 74'			Attendance: 6,800; Referee: Erich Linemayr

3 December 1978 16	Austria Salzburg	1-0	Austria Wien	Stadion Lehen, Salzburg
15:00	Auer 17'			Attendance: 10,000; Referee: Josef Bucek

9 December 1978 17	Austria Wien	4-2	First Vienna	Praterstadion, Vienna
14:00	Parits 6', 26'; Daxbacher 51'; Baumeister 60'		Caha 68'; Lorenz 77'	Attendance: 1,800; Referee: Franz Latzin

17 December 1978 18	Grazer AK	0-3	Austria Wien	Liebenau Stadion, Graz
13:00			Schachner 40'; Daxbacher 72'; Zach 78'	Attendance: 5,000; Referee: Horst Brummeier

24 February 1979 19	Rapid Wien	1-2	Austria Wien	Weststadion, Vienna
15:00	Happich 70' (pen.)		Gasselich 60'; Baumeister 62'	Attendance: 13,000; Referee: Wilhelm Jarosch

3 March 1979 20	Austria Wien	0-1	VÖEST Linz	Praterstadion, Vienna
15:30			Haider 43'	Attendance: 6,000; Referee: Wolfgang Klocker

10 March 1979 21	Admira/Wacker	1-3	Austria Wien	Bundesstadion, Vienna
15:00	Gassner 58'		Gasselich 25'; Schachner 66'; Parits 80' (pen.)	Attendance: 8,000; Referee: Rupert Rück

17 March 1979 22	Austria Wien	4-2	Wiener Sport-Club	Praterstadion, Vienna
16:00	Schachner 52', 62', 78'; Prohaska 70'		Brauneder 6'; Drabits 77'	Attendance: Siegfried Goriupp; Referee: 6,000

24 March 1979 23	Sturm Graz	2-3	Austria Wien	Liebenau Stadion, Graz
16:00	Jurtin 26', 58'		Schachner 59', 70'; Borgan 76'	Attendance: 12,000; Referee: Alfons Jungwirth

31 March 1979 24	SSW Innsbruck	1-1	Austria Wien	Tivoli Stadion, Innsbruck
16:00	Koncilia 36'		Schachner 52'	Attendance: 10,000; Referee: Erich Linemayr

7 April 1979 25	Austria Wien	0-0	Austria Salzburg	Praterstadion, Vienna
16:00				Attendance: 3,500; Referee: Josef Bucek

13 April 1979 26	First Vienna	1-2	Austria Wien	Hohe Warte Stadion, Vienna
19:00	Lorenz 55'		Sara 33'; Schachner 50'	Attendance: 4,500; Referee: Wilhelm Jarosch

21 April 1979 27	Austria Wien	3-1	Grazer AK	Praterstadion, Vienna
16:30	Parits 8', 49', 52'		Vidalli 90'	Attendance: 2,500; Referee: Fritz Schachhuber

28 April 1979 28	Austria Wien	4-1	Rapid Wien	Praterstadion, Vienna
16:30	Prohaska 32'; Parits 42'; Sara 69'; Schachner 89'		Pawlek 67'	Attendance: 6,000; Referee: Horst Brummeier

4 May 1979 29	VÖEST Linz	0-0	Austria Wien	Linzer Stadion, Linz
19:00				Attendance: 7,500; Referee: Josef Bucek

12 May 1979 30	Austria Wien	2-1	Admira/Wacker	Hohe Warte Stadium, Vienna
15:00	Prohaska 45'; Pfeiler 56'		Troindl 85'	Attendance: 10,000; Referee: Eduard Malik

19 May 1979 31	Wiener Sport-Club	2-4	Austria Wien	Wiener Sport-Club Platz, Vienna
17:00	Starek 22'; Ritter 78'		Parits 17' (pen.); Schachner 32', 86'; Gasselich 45'	Attendance: 7,000; Referee: Franz Latzin

26 May 1979 32	Austria Wien	4-2	Sturm Graz	Hohe Warte Stadium, Vienna
17:00	Dihanich 43'; Schachner 52'; Pospichil 60'; Gamauf 64'		Jurtin 15', 83' (pen.)	Attendance: 6,000; Referee: Gerald Losert

1 June 1979 33	Austria Wien	4-0	SSW Innsbruck	Wiener Sport-Club Platz, Vienna
19:00	Daxbacher 9', 59'; Baumeister 64', 87'			Attendance: 12,000; Referee: Adolf Matthias

8 June 1979 34	Austria Salzburg	2-2	Austria Wien	Stadion Lehen, Salzburg
19:00	Hörgl 20'; Perlak 31'		Pfeiler 13'; Sara 78'	Attendance: 7,000; Referee: Fritz Schachhuber

15 June 1979 35	Austria Wien	1-2	First Vienna	Praterstadion, Vienna
19:00				Attendance: 2,218; Referee: Josef Bucek

22 June 1979 36	Grazer AK	2-4	Austria Wien	Stadion Liebenau, Graz
19:00	Pigel 23'; Zuenelli 83'		Baumeister 21'; Pfeiler 35', 43'; Maier 55' (o.g.)	Attendance: 3,000; Referee: Franz Bogendorfer

=== ÖFB-Cup ===
15 August 1978 Second round	Vorwärts Steyr	3-1	Austria Wien	Vorwärts-Stadion, Steyr
16:15	Bauer 5'; Stöffelbauer 25'; Berger 30'		Parits 50'	Referee: Wolfgang Klocker

=== European Cup ===
==== First round ====
13 September 1978 First leg	Vllaznia (Albania)	2-0	Austria Wien	Loro Boriçi Stadium, Shkodër
15:30	Zhega 8'; Ballgjini 55'			Attendance: 10,000; Referee: Otto Anderco (Romania)

27 September 1978 Second leg	Austria Wien	4-1	(Albania) Vllaznia	Praterstadion, Vienna
17:00	Parits 21'; Schachner 35', 74'; Sara 48'		Hafizi 80'	Attendance: 26,000; Referee: Antonin Vencl (Czechoslovakia)

==== Second round ====
18 October 1978 First leg	Austria Wien	4-1	(Norway) Lillestrøm	Praterstadion, Vienna
19:00	Gasselich 25', 34'; Sara 36'; Schachner 65'		Dokken 62'	Attendance: 24,000; Referee: Bruno Galler (Switzerland)

1 November 1978 First round	Lillestrøm (Norway)	0-0	Austria Wien	Ullevaal Stadion, Oslo
18:00				Attendance: 5,589; Referee: Albert Victor (Luxembourg)

==== Quarter-finals ====
7 March 1979 First leg	Austria Wien	3–1	(East Germany) Dynamo Dresden	Praterstadion, Vienna
18:30	Schachner 20', 90'; Zach 86'		Weber 9'	Attendance: 36,000; Referee: Pat Partridge (England)

21 March 1979 Second leg	Dynamo Dresden (East Germany)	1–0	Austria Wien	Dynamo-Stadion, Dresden
16:00	Riedel 42' (pen.)			Attendance: 35,000; Referee: Jan Keizer (Royal Dutch Football Association)

==== Semi-finals ====
11 April 1979 First leg	Austria Wien	0-0	(Sweden) Malmö FF	Praterstadion, Vienna
18:30				Attendance: 64,000; Referee: Alek Jarguz (Poland)

25 April 1979 Second leg	Malmö FF (Sweden)	1–0	Austria Wien	Malmö Stadion, Malmö
18:00	Hansson 47'			Attendance: 25,239; Referee: Robert Wurtz (France)
