= 1988 Austrian Supercup =

- Event: 1988 Austrian Supercup
Kremser SC	Swarovski Tirol
1	1
- After extra time Rapid Wien won 3–1 on penalties
- Date: 16 July 1988
- Venue: Sepp-Doll-Stadion, Krems an der Donau
- Referee: Kuno Felder
- Attendance: 6,000

The 1988 Austrian Supercup was a football match that saw the 1987–88 Bundesliga champions Rapid Wien face off against 1987–88 Austrian Cup winners Kremser SC. It was the third straight Supercup appearance for Rapid Wien. The match was held on 16 July 1988 at the Sepp-Doll-Stadion in Krems an der Donau. Rapid Wien defended their title for the third year in succession.

== Match details ==
16 July 1988
17:00 CET

Kremser SC	1–1 (a.e.t.)	Rapid Wien
Drabek 58'		Stojadinović 77'
Penalties
Netuschill (penalty scored); Batričević (penalty missed); Janeschitz (penalty missed); Höld (penalty missed)	1–3	(penalty scored) Stojadinović; (penalty missed) Brauneder; (penalty scored) Shavlo; (penalty scored) Weber

Sepp-Doll-Stadion, Krems an der Donau
Attendance: 6,000
Referee: Kuno Felder

Kremser SC:
GK	-	(Austria) Horst Kirasitsch
DF	-	(Socialist Federal Republic of Yugoslavia) Slobodan Batričević
DF	-	(Austria) Franz Miesbauer
MF	-	(Austria) Johann Drabek	(substituted off) 80'
MF	-	(Austria) Erwin Höld
MF	-	(Austria) Erwin Wolf
MF	-	(Austria) Johannes Neumayer
FW	-	(Austria) Peter Netuschill
FW	-	(Socialist Federal Republic of Yugoslavia) Nedeljko Milosavljević
FW	-	(Austria) Hans Krankl	(substituted off) 73'
FW	-	(Austria) Thomas Janeschitz
Substitutes:
FW	-	(Austria) Ronald Otto	(substituted on) 73'
DF	-	(Austria) Thomas Pirkner	(substituted on) 80'
Manager:
(Austria) Karl Daxbacher

Rapid Wien:
GK	1	(Austria) Michael Konsel
DF	6	(Austria) Reinhard Kienast
DF	2	(Austria) Peter Schöttel
DF	4	(Austria) Robert Pecl
DF	5	(Austria) Heribert Weber
MF	10	(Austria) Gerald Willfurth
MF	13	(Austria) Franz Blizenec	(yellow card) 59'	(substituted off) 63'
MF	15	(Austria) Karl Brauneder
FW	-	(Austria) Paul Perstling		(substituted off) 46'
FW	-	(Socialist Federal Republic of Yugoslavia) Zoran Stojadinović
FW	9	(Socialist Federal Republic of Yugoslavia) Zlatko Kranjčar
Substitutes:
MF	-	(Austria) Heimo Pfeifenberger		(substituted on) 46'
MF	-	(Soviet Union) Sergey Shavlo		(substituted on) 63'
Manager:
(Socialist Federal Republic of Yugoslavia) Otto Barić

== See also ==
- 1987–88 Austrian Football Bundesliga
- 1987–88 Austrian Cup
