= 1978–79 Austrian Football Bundesliga =

61st season of top-tier football league in Austria

Austrian Bundesliga
- Season: 1978–79
- Dates: 18 August 1978 - 22 June 1979
- Champions: FK Austria Wien
- Relegated: FC Wacker Innsbruck
- European Cup: FK Austria Wien
- Cup Winners' Cup: FC Wacker Innsbruck
- UEFA Cup: Wiener Sport-Club; SK Rapid Wien
- Goals: 500
- Top goalscorer: Walter Schachner (24)

Statistics of Austrian Football Bundesliga in the 1978–79 season.

== Overview ==
It was contested by 10 teams, and FK Austria Wien won the championship.

=== Teams and location ===
Location of teams in the 1978–79 Austrian Football Bundesliga

Teams of 1978–79 Austrian Football Bundesliga

- FC Admira/Wacker
- Austria Salzburg
- Austria Wien
- First Vienna
- Grazer AK
- Rapid Wien
- Sturm Graz
- VÖEST Linz
- Wacker Innsbruck
- Wiener Sport-Club

== League standings ==
Pos	Team	Pld	W	D	L	GF	GA	GD	Pts	Qualification or relegation
1	FK Austria Wien	36	25	5	6	88	44	+44	55	Qualification to European Cup first round
2	Wiener Sportclub	36	15	11	10	71	54	+17	41	Qualification to UEFA Cup first round
3	SK Rapid Wien	36	13	13	10	52	42	+10	39	Qualification to UEFA Cup first round
4	SK Sturm Graz	36	14	9	13	43	50	−7	37	
5	VÖEST Linz	36	11	14	11	41	44	−3	36	
6	SV Austria Salzburg	36	13	10	13	38	53	−15	36	
7	FC Admira/Wacker	36	13	8	15	42	43	−1	34	
8	First Vienna FC	36	9	11	16	48	62	−14	29	
9	Grazer AK	36	7	15	14	36	53	−17	29	
10	FC Wacker Innsbruck	36	8	8	20	41	55	−14	24	Qualification to Cup Winners' Cup first round

Source: bundesliga.at
Rules for classification: 1) points; 2) goal difference; 3) number of goals scored.

== Results ==
Teams played each other four times in the league. In the first half of the season each team played every other team twice (home and away), and then did the same in the second half of the season.

=== First half of season ===
Home \ Away	ADM	ASZ	AWI	FIR	GAK	RWI	STU	VOE	WIE	WKR
Admira/Wacker		2–0	1–1	3–3	0–0	0–1	3–1	2–0	3–2	1–1
Austria Salzburg	1–0		1–0	2–0	2–0	1–0	2–0	1–0	0–0	2–1
Austria Wien	1–0	4–1		4–2	4–1	5–1	4–1	1–3	3–1	3–0
First Vienna	2–1	4–0	1–3		3–3	3–2	0–0	1–0	2–2	1–1
Grazer AK	0–1	1–2	0–3	0–1		1–1	1–2	3–0	1–1	1–0
Rapid Wien	1–1	4–0	3–1	2–1	3–1		3–0	0–1	1–0	2–0
Sturm Graz	2–0	0–0	0–3	3–1	1–1	0–0		2–2	3–2	2–0
VOEST Linz	1–0	1–0	1–2	3–2	1–2	0–0	1–0		2–2	3–1
Wiener SC	2–1	6–1	1–3	5–1	1–1	3–3	3–0	0–0		0–0
Wacker Innsbruck	0–2	4–1	4–0	3–0	5–1	0–2	1–1	2–2	0–3	

Legend: Blue = home team win; Yellow = draw; Red = away team win.

=== Second half of season ===
Home \ Away	ADM	ASZ	AWI	FIR	GAK	RWI	STU	VOE	WIE	WKR
Admira/Wacker		0–3	1–3	2–1	1–1	1–2	0–1	2–1	4–0	1–0
Austria Salzburg	1–1		2–2	0–1	1–1	2–2	0–2	1–0	2–2	3–2
Austria Wien	2–1	0–0		1–2	3–1	4–1	4–2	0–1	4–2	4–0
First Vienna	2–3	0–2	1–2		2–1	1–1	0–0	0–0	2–3	1–1
Grazer AK	1–0	0–0	2–4	2–1		2–2	0–1	1–1	2–2	1–0
Rapid Wien	0–1	2–0	1–2	0–0	0–0		4–0	1–1	0–1	3–0
Sturm Graz	2–0	2–1	2–3	2–1	3–1	0–0		3–2	2–0	1–3
VOEST Linz	0–0	2–2	0–0	2–2	1–1	2–2	2–1		2–4	0–2
Wiener SC	3–0	4–1	2–4	3–2	0–0	3–0 (Note: Match awarded.)	2–1	1–2		3–0
Wacker Innsbruck	1–3	3–0	1–1	0–1	0–1	4–2	0–0	0–1	1–2	

Legend: Blue = home team win; Yellow = draw; Red = away team win.

== Top goalscorers ==
Rank	Scorer	Club	Goals
1	(Austria) Walter Schachner	FK Austria Wien	24
2	(Austria) Thomas Parits	FK Austria Wien	22
3	(Uruguay) Alberto Martínez	Wiener Sport-Club	20
4	(Austria) Gernot Jurtin	SK Sturm Graz	18
5	(Austria) Willi Kreuz	VÖEST Linz	16
6	(Germany) Bernd Lorenz	First Vienna FC	13
6	(Austria) Peter Koncilia	FC Wacker Innsbruck	13
8	(Austria) Alfred Drabits	Wiener Sport-Club	12
9	(Socialist Federal Republic of Yugoslavia) Vukan Perović	SK Rapid Wien	11
10	(Austria) Geza Gallos	SK Rapid Wien	10

== See also ==
- 1978-79 Austrian Cup
