= 1977–78 Austrian Football Bundesliga =

60th season of top-tier football league in Austria

Austrian Bundesliga
- Season: 1977–78
- Dates: 9 August 1977 – 6 May 1978
- Champions: FK Austria Wien
- Relegated: LASK
- European Cup: FK Austria Wien
- Cup Winners' Cup: FC Wacker Innsbruck
- UEFA Cup: SK Rapid Wien; SK Sturm Graz
- Goals: 503
- Top goalscorer: Hans Krankl (41)

Statistics of Austrian Football Bundesliga in the 1977–78 season.

== Overview ==
It was contested by 10 teams, and FK Austria Wien won the championship.

=== Teams and locations ===
Location of teams in the 1977–78 Austrian Football Bundesliga

Teams of 1977–78 Austrian Football Bundesliga

- FC Admira/Wacker
- Austria Wien
- First Vienna
- Grazer AK
- LASK
- Rapid Wien
- Sturm Graz
- VÖEST Linz
- Wacker Innsbruck
- Wiener Sport-Club

== League standings ==
Pos	Team	Pld	W	D	L	GF	GA	GD	Pts	Qualification or relegation
1	FK Austria Wien	36	23	10	3	77	34	+43	56	Qualification to European Cup first round
2	SK Rapid Wien	36	16	10	10	76	43	+33	42	Qualification to UEFA Cup first round
3	FC Wacker Innsbruck	36	15	9	12	49	34	+15	39	Qualification to Cup Winners' Cup first round
4	SK Sturm Graz	36	13	12	11	51	54	−3	38	Qualification to UEFA Cup first round
5	VÖEST Linz	36	10	13	13	45	49	−4	33	
6	Grazer AK	36	10	13	13	44	49	−5	33	
7	First Vienna FC	36	12	8	16	34	54	−20	32	
8	Wiener Sportclub	36	8	15	13	47	61	−14	31	
9	FC Admira/Wacker	36	8	12	16	45	67	−22	28	
10	Linzer ASK	36	9	10	17	35	58	−23	28	Relegated to 1978-79 2. Liga

Source: bundesliga.at
Rules for classification: 1) points; 2) goal difference; 3) number of goals scored.

== Results ==
Teams played each other four times in the league. In the first half of the season each team played every other team twice (home and away), and then did the same in the second half of the season.

=== First half of season ===
Home \ Away	ADM	AWI	FIR	GAK	LIN	RWI	STU	VOE	WIE	WKR
Admira/Wacker		3–4	2–0	1–1	2–1	2–0	2–2	2–2	0–1	0–2
Austria Wien	3–1		5–3	3–0	2–1	3–2	3–1	1–1	0–0	1–0
First Vienna	3–2	1–2		0–1	0–0	0–0	3–2	2–1	1–0	1–0
Grazer AK	1–1	0–3	0–0		0–0	4–2	3–1	1–1	1–1	3–2
Linzer ASK	4–2	0–3	4–1	2–1		1–3	1–1	0–0	2–0	2–1
Rapid Wien	3–1	0–1	0–1	1–1	1–0		2–2	4–0	1–2	0–0
Sturm Graz	2–1	3–1	0–0	1–0	1–1	1–3		5–2	3–1	1–3
VÖEST Linz	1–0	1–1	4–0	1–0	3–1	1–1	1–2		3–3	0–1
Wiener SC	1–2	0–0	1–0	4–4	3–2	2–7	2–3	3–0		1–0
Wacker Innsbruck	1–1	1–1	1–0	2–0	4–1	2–0	2–0	2–1	2–0	

Legend: Blue = home team win; Yellow = draw; Red = away team win.

=== Second half of season ===
Home \ Away	ADM	AWI	FIR	GAK	LIN	RWI	STU	VOE	WIE	WKR
Admira/Wacker		1–1	1–2	2–1	1–0	1–5	1–1	1–1	2–2	2–0
Austria Wien	3–2		3–1	3–1	1–0	3–0	6–1	2–0	6–0	1–1
First Vienna	2–1	2–1		1–1	1–1	2–1	0–2	1–1	1–1	1–0
Grazer AK	3–0	2–1	3–0		3–0	1–2	1–0	1–0	1–1	0–1
Linzer ASK	0–1	0–2	1–0	2–2		0–6	1–1	2–1	0–0	1–1
Rapid Wien	6–0	0–0	4–1	1–1	6–0		4–1	2–1	3–2	3–1
Sturm Graz	0–0	1–1	3–0	1–1	1–0	1–1		3–1	1–0	1–0
VÖEST Linz	2–2	1–1	2–1	4–0	0–1	2–0	1–0		1–0	2–1
Wiener SC	2–2	2–3	1–2	3–1	2–1	1–1	1–1	1–1		3–3
Wacker Innsbruck	4–0	1–2	2–0	1–0	1–2	1–1	4–1	1–1	0–0	

Legend: Blue = home team win; Yellow = draw; Red = away team win.

== Top goalscorers ==
Rank	Scorer	Club	Goals
1	(Austria) Hans Krankl	SK Rapid Wien	41
2	(Austria) Hans Pirkner	FK Austria Wien	20
3	(Austria) Thomas Parits	SK Rapid Wien	15
4	(Austria) Mario Zuenelli	Grazer AK	14
4	(Austria) Anton Haas	SK Sturm Graz	14
6	(Austria) Johann Krejcirik	SK Rapid Wien	12
7	(Austria) Max Hagmayr	VÖEST Linz	11
8	(Austria) Alfred Gassner	Admira Wacker	10
8	(Austria) Walter Demel	Wiener Sport-Club	10
8	(Austria) August Starek	Wiener Sport-Club	10
8	(Austria) Gernot Jurtin	SK Sturm Graz	10

== See also ==
- 1977-78 Austrian Cup
