= Gökçek =

Gökçek is a Turkish word and may refer to:

== Given name ==
- Gökçek Vederson (born Wederson Luiz da Silva Medeiros in 1981), Brazilian-Turkish footballer

== Surname ==
- Dilan Deniz Gökçek, Turkish female football referee
- Hakan Gökçek (born 1993), Austria n footballer of Turkish descent
- Kadriye Gökçek, Turkish female retired football referee
- Melih Gökçek (1948), Turkish politician and former Mayor of Ankara

== Places ==
- Gökçek, Evciler, a village in the district of Evciler, Afyonkarahisar Province, Turkey
- Gökçek Park, a public park in Ankara, Turkey
