= Slobodan Batričević =

Serbian footballer and manager

Personal information
- Full name: Slobodan Batričević
- Date of birth: 3 January 1958 (age 68)
- Place of birth: Belgrade, FPR Yugoslavia
- Height: 1.82 m (5 ft 11 1/2 in)
- Position: Defender

Senior career*
Years	Team	Apps	(Gls)
1975–1976	AIK Bačka Topola	11	(1)
1976–1985	OFK Beograd	153	(9)
1985–1987	First Vienna	63	(3)
1987–1991	Kremser SC	133	(1)
1991–1993	LASK	64	(1)
1993	Kremser SC	15	(1)
Total		439	(16)

International career
1983	Yugoslavia	1	(0)

Managerial career
- 1993: Kremser SC
- 2005: LASK (youth)
- 2006: Admira Wacker Mödling (A)
- 2007: Wiener SK
- 2008–2009: Wiener SK
- 2009: Zwettl
- 2011: SC Mannswörth
- 2011–2012: Kremser SC
- 2012–2016: St. Pölten (academy)
- 2016-2017: SV Horn (youth)
- 2017–2021: FC Stadlau
- 2022–2023: USV Raabs/Thaya
- * Club domestic league appearances and goals

Slobodan Batričević (Serbian Cyrillic: Слободан Батричевић; born 3 January 1958) is a Serbian football manager and former player.

== International career ==
Batričević was capped once by Yugoslavia, in a March 1983 friendly match away against Romania.

== Managerial career ==
After his playing career, Batričević has been a manager with several clubs in Austria.
