= Hermann Stessl =

Austrian footballer (born 1940)

Personal information
- Date of birth: 3 September 1940 (age 86)
- Place of birth: Graz, Austria
- Position: Midfielder

Youth career
- 1952–1957: Grazer AK

Senior career*
Years	Team	Apps	(Gls)
1957–1969	Grazer AK	188	(21)
1969–1970	FC Dornbirn	15	(0)
Total		203	(21)

Managerial career
- 1969–1970: SV Leibnitz
- 1970–1972: SV Wolfsberg
- 1974–1975: SV Kapfenberg
- 1974–1977: Grazer AK
- 1977–1979: Austria Wien
- 1979–1980: AEK Athens
- 1980–1982: Porto
- 1982–1983: Boavista
- 1983–1984: Vitória de Guimarães
- 1984–1985: Sturm Graz
- 1985–1986: Austria Wien
- 1986–1987: FC Zürich
- 1988: Racing Santander
- 1989: SC Eisenstadt
- 1992: Kremser SC
- 1992–1993: Austria Wien
- 1995–1996: Austria Salzburg
- * Club domestic league appearances and goals

Hermann Stessl (born 3 September 1940) is an Austrian former football player and coach.

== Career ==
Born in Graz, Stessl played for Grazer AK, starting his first team career in 1957.

Stessl coached FC Zürich Grazer AK, Austria Wien, AEK Athens, FC Porto, Austria Salzburg and Boavista.

With Austria Wien, he won four Austrian football championships in 1978, 1979, 1986 and 1993. With Austria, he also reached the final of the European Cup Winners' Cup 1977–78, losing 4–0 to Belgium's R.S.C. Anderlecht.

He now runs a football academy, the Hermann Stessl Fußballschule.
