= Thomas Nentwich =

Austrian footballer and manager

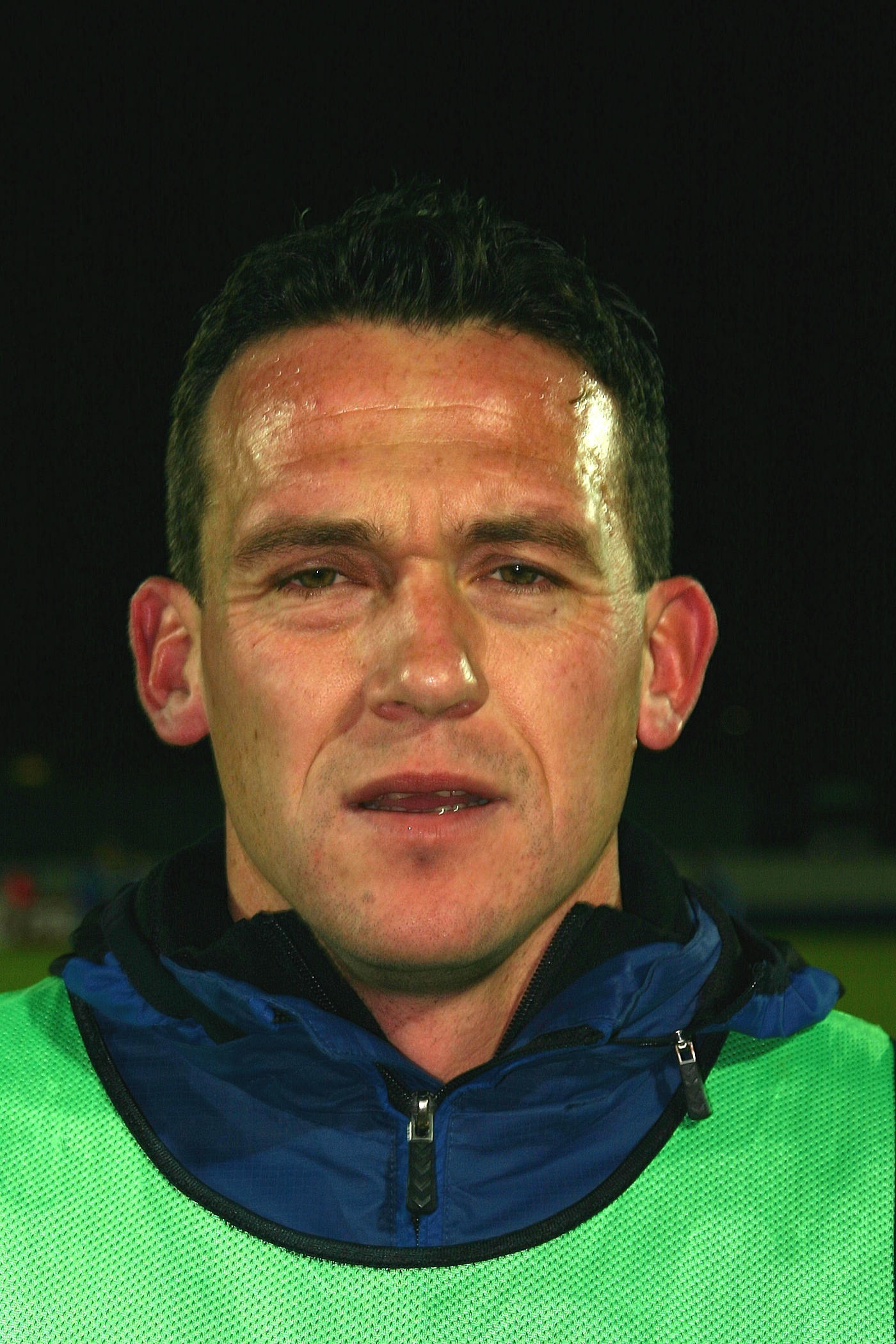
- Nentwich in 2008

Personal information
- Date of birth: 22 December 1975 (age 50)
- Place of birth: Austria
- Height: 1.82 m (6 ft 0 in)
- Position: Defender

Senior career*
Years	Team	Apps	(Gls)
–1995	SV Würmla		
1995–2000	FCN St. Pölten	134	(4)
2000–2005	SV Ried	112	(11)
2005–2009	SKN St. Pölten	84	(7)

Managerial career
- 2011–2012: SV Würmla
- 2013: SKN St. Pölten (interim)
- * Club domestic league appearances and goals

Thomas Nentwich (born 22 December 1975) is a retired Austrian football player and a football manager.
