= 1987–88 Austrian Cup =

Tournament details
- Country: Austria

Final positions
- Champions: Kremser SC
- Runners-up: Swarovski Tirol

The 1987–88 Austrian Cup (German: ÖFB-Cup) was the 54th season of Austria's nationwide football cup competition. The final was played over two legs, on 24 May 1988 at the Stadion, Krems and on 1 June 1988 at the Tivoli, Innsbruck.

The competition was won by Kremser SC after beating Swarovski Tirol on away goals rule after the tie finished 3–3 on aggregate.

== Second round ==
Team 1	Score	Team 2
7 August 1987
FC Dornbirn	1–0	SC Kundl
8 August 1987
FC Puch	5–1	ASV Salzburg
SC Zwettl	2–1	Badener AC
10 August 1987
FC Andorf	1–1 (a.e.t.) (4–2 p)	Grazer AK
11 August 1987
1. SC Wiener Neustadt	5–0	SV Blindenmarkt
ASK-BSC Bruck/Leitha	0–4	SK Rapid Wien
Amateure Steyr	2–6	SK Sturm Graz
Deutschlandsberger SC	2–1	Donawitzer SV Alpine
Eggenberger SK Graz	1–2	SK Vorwärts Steyr
Eintracht Wels	1–0	SV Flavia Solva
FC St. Margarethen	0–4	Kremser SC
Floridsdorfer AC	1–4	First Vienna FC
Groß Viktoria	2–4	Wiener Sport-Club
LUV Graz	1–1 (a.e.t.) (5–4 p)	SV Spittal/Drau
Rapid Lienz	2–1	SV Grieskirchen
SAK Klagenfurt	1–0	Kapfenberger SV
SC Weiz	1–1 (a.e.t.) (4–5 p)	SV Feldkirchen
SG Tulln/ASV Vösendorf	1–6	FK Austria Wien
SK St. Magdalena	2–0	Austria Klagenfurt
SV Alpine Kindberg	1–4	Linzer ASK
SV Haiming	1–6 (a.e.t.)	FC Kufstein
SV Hallwang	1–2	FC Swarovski Tirol
SV Neuberg	2–4	VfB Union Mödling
SV Ried	1–0	VOEST Linz
SV Rum	2–5	SV Austria Salzburg
SV Schwechat	3–7	VSE St. Pölten
Slovan/HAC	1–0	Admira/Wacker
USV Rudersdorf	0–2	1. SV Wiener Neudorf
VfB Hohenems	2–1	USV Salzburg-Taxham
WSG Wattens	2–0	Salzburger AK 1914
Wolfsberger AC	3–2 (a.e.t.)	TSV Hartberg
12 August 1987
SV Oberwart	2–1	SC Eisenstadt

== Third round ==
Team 1	Score	Team 2
29 March 1988
1. SC Wiener Neustadt	0–1	SK Rapid Wien
LUV Graz	0–0 (a.e.t.) (3–5 p)	Linzer ASK
Rapid Lienz	0–3	FC Swarovski Tirol
SK St. Magdalena	1–7	FK Austria Wien
Slovan/HAC	1–3	First Vienna FC
3 April 1988
SAK Klagenfurt	3–2	SK Vorwärts Steyr
4 April 1988
1. SV Wiener Neudorf	0–3	VSE St. Pölten
Deutschlandsberger SC	0–3	SK Sturm Graz
Eintracht Wels	0–1 (a.e.t.)	SV Ried
FC Dornbirn	1–1 (a.e.t.) (3–5 p)	FC Kufstein
FC Puch	2–0	VfB Hohenems
SC Zwettl	1–4	Kremser SC
SV Feldkirchen	0–1	VfB Union Mödling
SV Oberwart	0–1	Wiener Sport-Club
WSG Wattens	3–0	SV Austria Salzburg
Wolfsberger AC	2–1	FC Andorf

== Fourth round ==
Team 1	Score	Team 2
19 April 1988
FK Austria Wien	2–2 (a.e.t.) (1–3 p)	SK Sturm Graz
Kremser SC	2–0	FC Puch
SK Rapid Wien	1–2 (a.e.t.)	First Vienna FC
SAK Klagenfurt	1-1 (a.e.t.) (3–4 p)	WSG Wattens
SV Ried	0–1	FC Swarovski Tirol
VSE St. Pölten	0–1 (a.e.t.)	Linzer ASK
VfB Union Mödling	1–1 (a.e.t.) (4–2 p)	FC Kufstein
Wolfsberger AC	1–1 (a.e.t.) (4–5 p)	Wiener Sport-Club

== Quarter-finals ==
Team 1	Score	Team 2
3 May 1988
SK Sturm Graz	1–5	FC Swarovski Tirol
First Vienna FC	1–4	VfB Union Mödling
WSG Wattens	3–4	Linzer ASK
Wiener Sport-Club	0–2	Kremser SC

== Semi-finals ==
Team 1	Score	Team 2
10 May 1988
FC Swarovski Tirol	4–2	Linzer ASK
Kremser SC	3–1 (a.e.t.)	VfB Union Mödling

== Final ==
=== First leg ===
24 May 1988
19:00

Kremser SC	2–0	FC Swarovski Tirol
Otto 72'; Janeschitz 70'	Report

Stadion, Krems
Attendance: 9,000
Referee: Friedrich Kaupe

=== Second leg ===
1 June 1988
19:30

FC Swarovski Tirol	3–1	Kremser SC
Wazinger 46'; Spielmann 80'; Marko 90'	Report	Wolf 13'

Tivoli, Innsbruck
Attendance: 9,000
Referee: Helmut Kohl

3–3 on aggregate. Kremser SC won on away goals.
