= Jochen Fallmann =

Austrian footballer (born 1979)

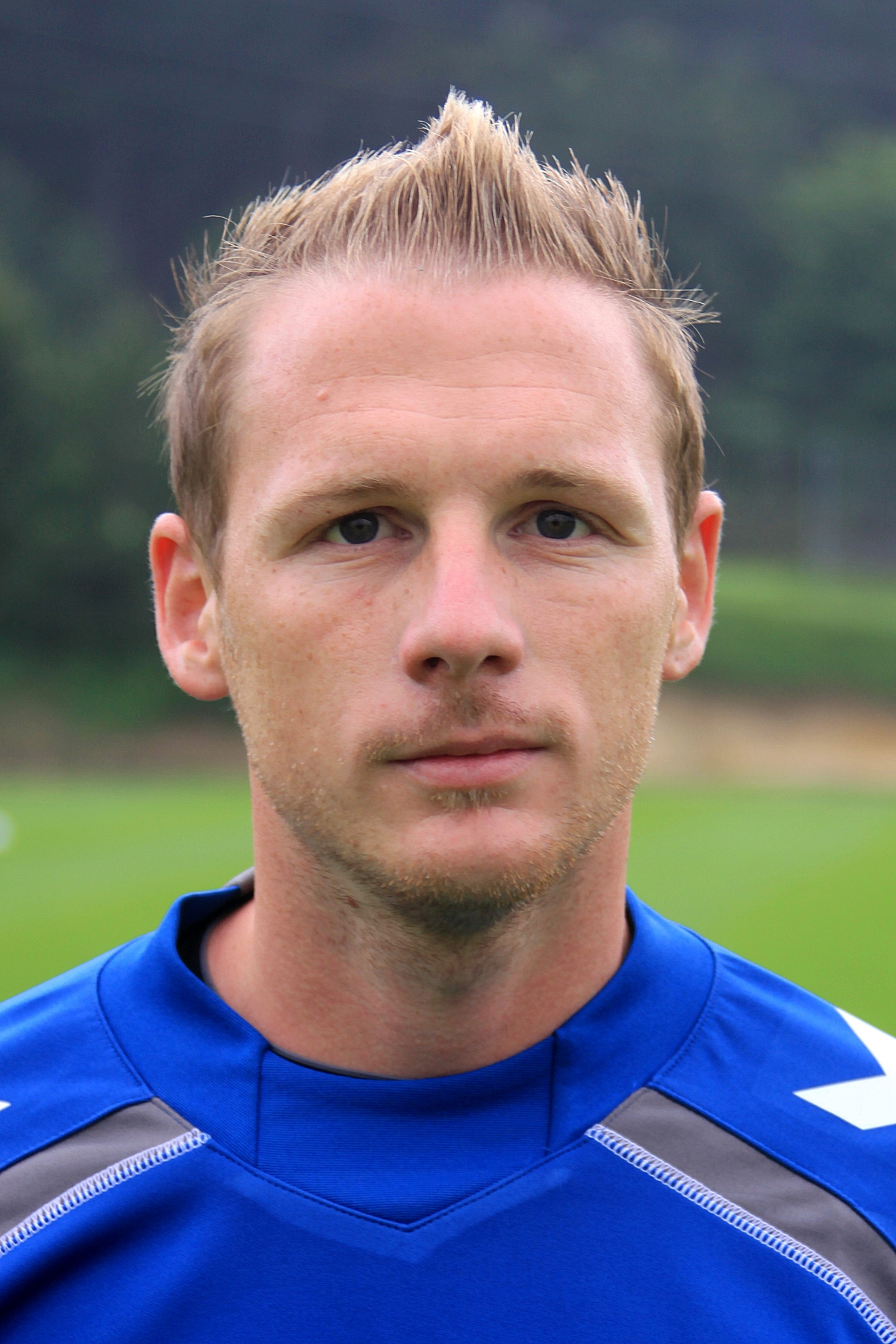

Personal information
- Date of birth: 19 February 1979 (age 47)
- Place of birth: St. Pölten, Austria
- Position: Midfielder

Senior career*
Years	Team	Apps	(Gls)
1997–2000	Admira Wacker	54	(1)
2000–2002	SV Braunau	66	(8)
2002–2005	LASK	75	(1)
2005–2012	St. Pölten	211	(26)
2012–2013	First Vienna	30	(4)
2013–2015	St. Pölten B	35	(3)

International career
1998–2000	Austria U21	7	(0)

Managerial career
- 2013–2015: St. Pölten B (player-manager)
- 2015: St. Pölten (caretaker)
- 2015–2016: St. Pölten (assistant)
- 2016: St. Pölten B (caretaker)
- 2016–2017: St. Pölten
- 2019–2020: SKU Amstetten
- 2020–2021: Austrian Wien (assistant)
- 2021–2023: SKU Amstetten
- * Club domestic league appearances and goals

Jochen Fallmann (born 19 February 1979) is an Austrian football coach and a former player.

== Coaching career ==
Fallmann took over of the reserve team of St. Pölten at the beginning of the 2013–14 season. His first match was a 3–2 win against ASK Bad Vöslau on 10 August 2013. He became the interim head coach of the first team on 21 March 2015. He became the third coach of the 2014–15 season after Herbert Gager was sacked in October 2014 and Michael Steiner was sacked on 21 March 2015. His final match as reserve team head coach was a 1–0 win against SV Neuberg on 21 March 2015.

He was appointed as first team assistant manager under Karl Daxbacher for the 2015/16 season. From 3 to 27 October, Fallmann took over the reserve team of the club as a caretaker manager. He was in charge for three games, and got only one point. On the same day, he was promoted to first team manager. In September 2017, he decided to resign.

In March 2019, he was appointed as manager of SKU Amstetten.

== Coaching record ==
As of 21 March 2015

Team	From	To	Record								
Team	From	To	M	W	D	L	GF	GA	GD	Win %	Ref.
St. Pölten (A)	1 June 2013	21 March 2015	48	27	5	16	106	57	+49	56.25	
St. Pölten	21 March 2015	Present	22	12	6	4	34	26	+8	54.55	
Total			70	39	11	20	140	83	+57	55.71	—
