= 1977–78 Austrian Cup =

Tournament details
- Country: Austria

Final positions
- Champions: SSW Innsbruck
- Runners-up: VÖEST Linz

The 1977–78 Austrian Cup (German: ÖFB-Cup) was the 44th season of Austria's nationwide football cup competition. The final was played over two legs, on 26 April 1978 at the Linzer Stadion, Linz and on 6 May 1978 at the Tivoli, Innsbruck.

The competition was won by SSW Innsbruck after beating VÖEST Linz 3–2 on aggregate.

== First round ==
Team 1	Score	Team 2
6 August 1977
Floridsdorfer AC	3–0	Kremser SC
KSV Böhlerwerk	1–3 (a.e.t.)	SC Eisenstadt
SV Rapid Lienz	1–2	SV Austria Salzburg
SC Brunn am Gebirge	2–4	SC Neusiedl am See
SV Frohnleiten	4–5	Wolfsberger AC
SV Heid Stockerau	6–1	Badener AC
ATUS Bärnbach	2–3 (a.e.t.)	SK Austria Klagenfurt
SV Traun	2–1 (a.e.t.)	FS Elektra Wien
Donawitzer SV Alpine	3–1	Union Wels
SV Spittal/Drau	0–2	Villacher SV
SC Amateure St. Veit/Glan	3–1	SC Magdalen
SC Kundl	1–3	ASK Salzburg
1. Halleiner SK	0–2	WSG Wattens
FC Rätia Bludenz	3–1 (a.e.t.)	SC Austria Lustenau
7 August 1977
ASV Kittsee	1–1 (a.e.t.) (1–4 p)	1. Simmeringer SC
SV Leithaprodersdorf	1–2	1. Wiener Neustädter SC
SV Ried	0–0 (a.e.t.) (2–4 p)	Kapfenberger SV
Slovan/HAC	0–3	SC Tulln
SV Ludesch	0–3	Salzburger AK 1914
SC Bruck/Mur	0–2	SV St. Veit
SV Grödig	2–1	FC Dornbirn
SVG Jenbach	2–4	Schwarz-Weiß Bregenz

== Second round ==
Team 1	Score	Team 2
26 October 1977
SV Grödig	0–2	Grazer AK
FC Rätia Bludenz	1–4 (a.e.t.)	ASK Salzburg
29 October 1977
Villacher SV	4–1	WSG Wattens
Kapfenberger SV	4–0	SC Eisenstadt
SV St. Veit	5–2	Schwarz-Weiß Bregenz
SC Austria Salzburg	4–0	Salzburger AK 1914
1 November 1977
SC Neusiedl am See	2–0	SV Traun
15 November 1977
SK Austria Klagenfurt	0–2	SK VÖEST Linz
8 December 1977
Floridsdorfer AC	2–1 (a.e.t.)	Wiener Sport-Club/Post SV Wien
1. Wiener Neustädter SC	1–2	FK Austria Wien
1. Simmeringer SC	1–2	FC Admira/Wacker
Donawitzer SV Alpine	1–2 (a.e.t.)	SSW Innsbruck
SC Amateure St. Veit	0–1	Linzer ASK
SC Tulln	0–3	First Vienna FC
SV Heid Stockerau	0–2	SK Rapid Wien
Wolfsberger AC	0–1	SK Sturm Graz

== Third round ==
Team 1	Score	Team 2
18 December 1977
SV Austria Salzburg	3–1	SC Neusiedl am See
21 December 1977
SK Sturm Graz	0–1	SSW Innsbruck
22 December 1977
Grazer AK	3–1	Floridsdorfer AC
26 December 1977
FK Austria Wien	5–0	FC Admira/Wacker
Villacher SV	1–3	Linzer ASK
Kapfenberger SV	1–1 (a.e.t.) (5–6 p)	SK Rapid Wien
First Vienna FC	0–0 (a.e.t.) (4–5 p)	SV St. Veit
SK VÖEST Linz	5–0	ASK Salzburg

== Quarter-finals ==
Team 1	Score	Team 2
7 March 1978
Linzer ASK	0–2	SSW Innsbruck
SV Austria Salzburg	3–2	Grazer AK
8 March 1978
SV St. Veit	2–4	FK Austria Wien
14 March 1978
SK VÖEST Linz	2–0	SK Rapid Wien

== Semi-finals ==
Team 1	Score	Team 2
19 April 1978
SV Austria Salzburg	0–0 (a.e.t.) (3–4 p)	SK VÖEST Linz
SSW Innsbruck	2–0	FK Austria Wien

== Final ==
=== First leg ===
26 April 1978
19:00

SK VÖEST Linz	1–1	SSW Innsbruck
Pöll 32'	Report	Welzl 64'

Linzer Stadion, Linz
Attendance: 8,000
Referee: Adolf Mathias

=== Second leg ===
6 May 1978
17:00

SSW Innsbruck	2–1	SK VÖEST Linz
Schwarz 7'; Koncilia 43'	Report	Hagmayr 5'

Tivoli, Innsbruck
Attendance: 8,500
Referee: Franz Wöhrer

SSW Innsbruck won 3–2 on aggregate.
