= Horst Kirasitsch =

Austrian footballer and manager

Personal information
- Date of birth: 30 November 1960 (age 65)
- Place of birth: St. Pölten, Austria
- Height: 1.90 m (6 ft 3 in)

Senior career*
Years	Team	Apps	(Gls)
1986–1988	First Vienna FC	24	(0)
1991–1994	VSE St. Pölten	66	(0)
1994–1995	SV Stockerau	4	(0)
1995–1998	VSE St. Pölten	66	(0)
1998	SV Würmla	14	(0)
- Kremser SC

Managerial career
- 1999–2001: USC Mank
- 2002–2003: SKN St. Pölten
- 2003–2004: Kremser SC
- 2005–2006: SV Oberndorf
- 2007–2008: SV Neulengbach
- 2008: ASK Loosdorf
- 2009–2010: USC Mank
- * Club domestic league appearances and goals

Horst Kirasitsch (born 30 November 1960) is a retired Austrian football player and a football manager who last managed USC Mank.

== Playing career ==
Kirasitsch played as a goalkeeper for First Vienna FC, Kremser SC, VSE St. Pölten, SV Stockerau and SV Würmla.

== Coaching career ==
Kirasitsch managed in the Austrian lower divisions between 1999 and 2008. He managed two clubs which he featured for during his playing career - Kremser SC and SKN St. Pölten.

== Coaching record ==
As of 27 May 2016

Team	From	To	Record								
Team	From	To	G	W	D	L	GF	GA	GD	Win %	Ref.
SKN St. Pölten	1 July 2002	30 June 2003	31	11	5	15	43	58	−15	35.48	
Kremser SC	1 July 2003	17 April 2004	23	8	8	7	34	42	−8	34.78	
