= Tuğberk Tanrıvermiş =

Turkish football manager

Personal information
- Full name: Tuğberk Tanrıvermiş
- Date of birth: April 17, 1989 (age 37)
- Place of birth: Istanbul, Turkey
- Position

Team information
- Current team: Hibernians FC Malta (Head Coach)

Managerial career
- Years: Team
- 2026-: Galatasaray (Assistant)
- 2017–2018: Galatasaray (Assistant)
- 2018–2021: Roma Primavera
- 2021–2022: Spezia (U19)
- 2022–2024: Roma (U18)
- 2024–2025: SKN St. Pölten
- 2025: NK Maribor

Tuğberk Tanrıvermiş (Turkish pronunciation: [[tuɰˈbɛɾc tanɾɯˈveɾmiʃ], born April 17, 1989, in Istanbul, Turkey) is a Turkish football manager and coach. He was last the head coach of the Slovenian club NK Maribor. Over the course of his career, Tanrıvermiş has worked with prestigious clubs in Turkey and Italy, focusing on youth development before transitioning to senior football management.

== Coaching career ==
=== Early career ===
Tanrıvermiş began his career at Galatasaray, where he managed youth teams starting in 2010. In 2011, he took on the role of assistant coach for the Galatasaray U19 team, focusing on player development and tactical training.

In 2013, he briefly worked as a scout for Galatasaray before joining Denizlispor as an assistant coach for their youth teams.

=== Success with Roma and Spezia ===
In 2018, Tanrıvermiş moved to Italy to join Roma’s youth setup, where he contributed to the club’s renowned development programs. His work focused on nurturing young talent and preparing them for professional football.

In 2021, Tanrıvermiş was appointed head coach of the Spezia U19 team, leading them for the 2021–22 season. He returned to Roma in 2022 to manage the Roma U18 team, a role he held until the conclusion of the 2023–24 season. In 2023, Tanrıvermiş was honored with the prestigious Italian Youth Football Excellence Award (Italian: Eccellenza del Calcio Giovanile Italiano), presented by FIGC for his innovative coaching methods and his success in developing young talents during his time at Roma. This recognition placed him among the most promising youth football coaches in Europe.

=== SKN St. Pölten ===
On 9 October 2024, Tanrıvermiş took his first senior team management role, becoming head coach of SKN St. Pölten in the Austrian Second Division. His appointment marked a significant transition from youth to professional senior football coaching. He registered 11 wins in 19 matches and the team finished fourth, narrowly missing out on promotion.

=== Maribor ===
On 12 June 2025, Tanrıvermiş was hired as the new manager of Slovenian team NK Maribor. His contract was terminated after just 49 days, on 18 August 2025, as Maribor managed to secure only two wins in the first five rounds of the Prva Liga competition and crashed out in the second qualifying round of the UEFA Conference League.

== Coaching philosophy ==
Tanrıvermiş is recognized for his emphasis on youth development, tactical flexibility, and modern training techniques. His career has been defined by his ability to prepare young players for professional success, blending data-driven approaches with traditional coaching methods.

== Career statistics ==
As of 19 August 2025

Team	Nat	From	To	G	W	D	L	GF	GA	Win %
Spezia U19	(Italy)	5 July 2021	30 June 2022	26	10	4	12	44	44	38.46
Roma U18	(Italy)	3 August 2022	30 June 2024	65	36	13	16	152	98	55.38
SKN St. Pölten	(Austria)	9 October 2024	30 June 2025	19	11	5	3	40	21	57.89
NK Maribor	(Slovenia)	1 July 2025	18 August 2025	7	2	3	2	11	10	28.57
Total				117	59	25	33	247	173	50.43
