= Ernst Weber (coach) =

Austrian football coach (1948–2011)

Personal information
- Date of birth: 5 October 1948
- Place of birth: Krumbach, Austria
- Position: Midfielder

Managerial career
- Years: Team
- 1999–2011: Austria

Ernst Weber (born 5 October 1948 – 6 April 2011) was an Austrian football player and manager.

Weber was the coach of the Austrian national team from 1999 to 2011.

== Honours ==
Coach

Kremser SC

- Austrian Cup: 1987–88
