= Wilhelm Cerny =

Austrian footballer (born 1955)

Personal information
- Date of birth: 30 January 1955 (age 71)
- Position: Midfielder

International career
Years	Team	Apps	(Gls)
1976	Austria	2	(0)

Wilhelm Cerny (born 30 January 1955) is an Austrian footballer. He played in two matches for the Austria national football team in 1976.
