= Gökçek Park =

Park in Ankara, Turkey

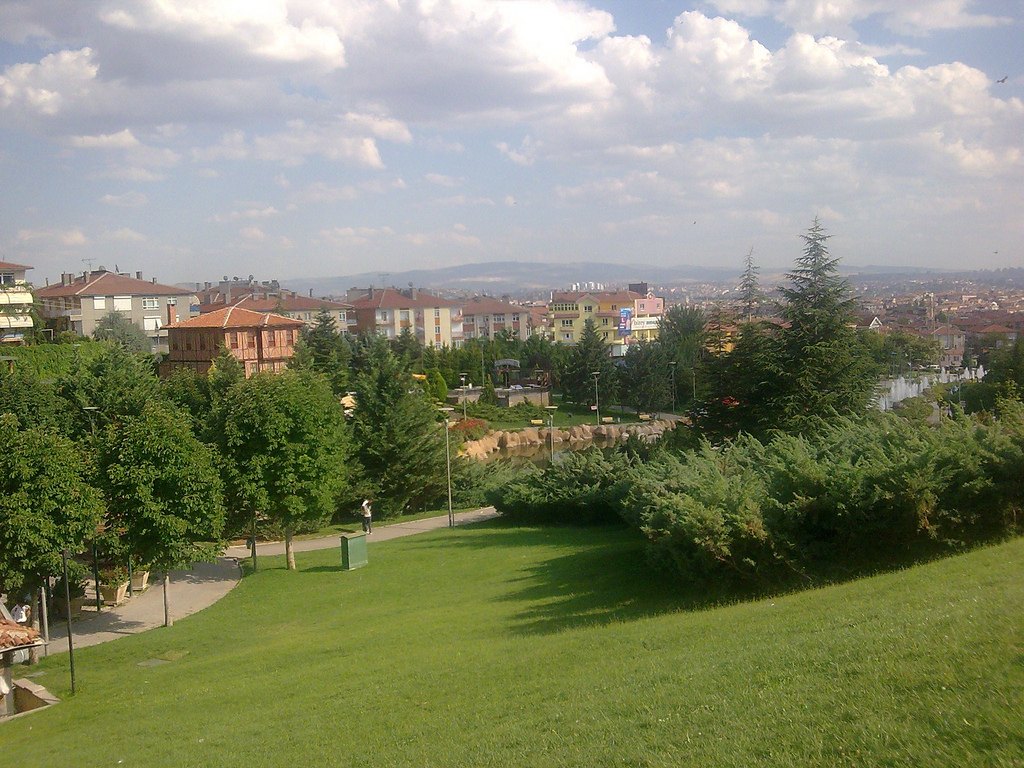
- A view of Göksu Park (2010)

- Location within Turkey
- Location: Keçiören, Ankara, Turkey
- Coordinates: 39°59′35.16″N 32°52′34.01″E
- Area: 5.4 ha (13 acres)
- Website: ANFA, the management

Gökçek Park is a public park in Ankara, Turkey. Gökçek Park is in Keçiören which is district of Ankara. The park area is about 5.4 ha (13 acres). It is named after Melih Gökçek, the former mayor of Ankara Metropolitan Municipality.
