= Hakan Gökçek =

Austrian footballer

Personal information
- Date of birth: 26 March 1993 (age 33)
- Place of birth: Vienna, Austria
- Height: 1.73 m (5 ft 8 in)
- Position: Winger

Team information
- Current team: SV Leobendorf
- Number: 17

Youth career
- 2002–2004: Post SV
- 2004–2007: Austria Wien
- 2007–2010: First Vienna

Senior career*
Years	Team	Apps	(Gls)
2010–2011	First Vienna II		
2011–2014	First Vienna	44	(1)
2014	Tarsus İdman Yurdu	9	(0)
2014–2015	First Vienna	11	(4)
2015	FC Liefering	0	(0)
2015	→ First Vienna (loan)	13	(1)
2015–2017	First Vienna	39	(5)
2017	FCM Traiskirchen	13	(4)
2017–2018	Tuzlaspor	16	(1)
2018–2020	FC Marchfeld	45	(12)
2020–2021	SV Stripfing	9	(1)
2022	Wiener Neustadt	6	(1)
2022–2024	TWL Elektra	55	(13)
2024–2025	Kremser SC	30	(11)
2025–	SV Leobendorf	32	(10)
- * Club domestic league appearances and goals as of 28 June 2026

Hakan Gökçek (born 26 March 1993) is an Austrian footballer who plays as a winger for Austrian Regionalliga club SV Leobendorf.
