= Hubert Baumgartner =

Austrian footballer and manager

Personal information
- Date of birth: 25 February 1955 (age 71)
- Place of birth: Wolfsberg, Austria
- Position: Goalkeeper

Senior career*
Years	Team	Apps	(Gls)
1973–1974	Alpine Donawitz	15	(0)
1974–1979	Austria Wien	130	(0)
1979–1982	Recreativo de Huelva	100	(0)
1982–1987	Admira Wacker	141	(0)
1987–1989	VSE St. Pölten	22	(0)
Total		408	(0)

International career
1978	Austria	1	(0)

Managerial career
- 1990–1993: VSE St. Pölten
- 1993–1994: Rapid Wien
- 1995–1996: VSE St. Pölten
- 1997: FC Linz
- * Club domestic league appearances and goals

Hubert Baumgartner (born 25 February 1955) is an Austrian former football player and manager. As a player, Baumgartner played professionally as a goalkeeper in both Austria and Spain; he also played at international level and was a squad member at the 1978 FIFA World Cup. After retiring as a player, Baumgartner became a football manager.

== Career ==
Born in Wolfsberg, Baumgartner played professionally in both Austria and Spain for Alpine Donawitz, Austria Wien, Recreativo de Huelva, Admira Wacker and VSE St. Pölten, making over 400 career appearances.

He earned one cap for the Austria national team in 1978, and was a squad member at the 1978 FIFA World Cup.

He also managed VSE St. Pölten, Rapid Wien and FC Linz.

== Honours ==
- Austrian Football Bundesliga (3):
  - 1975, 1978, 1979
- Austrian Cup (1):
  - 1977
