= Felix Gasselich =

Austrian footballer

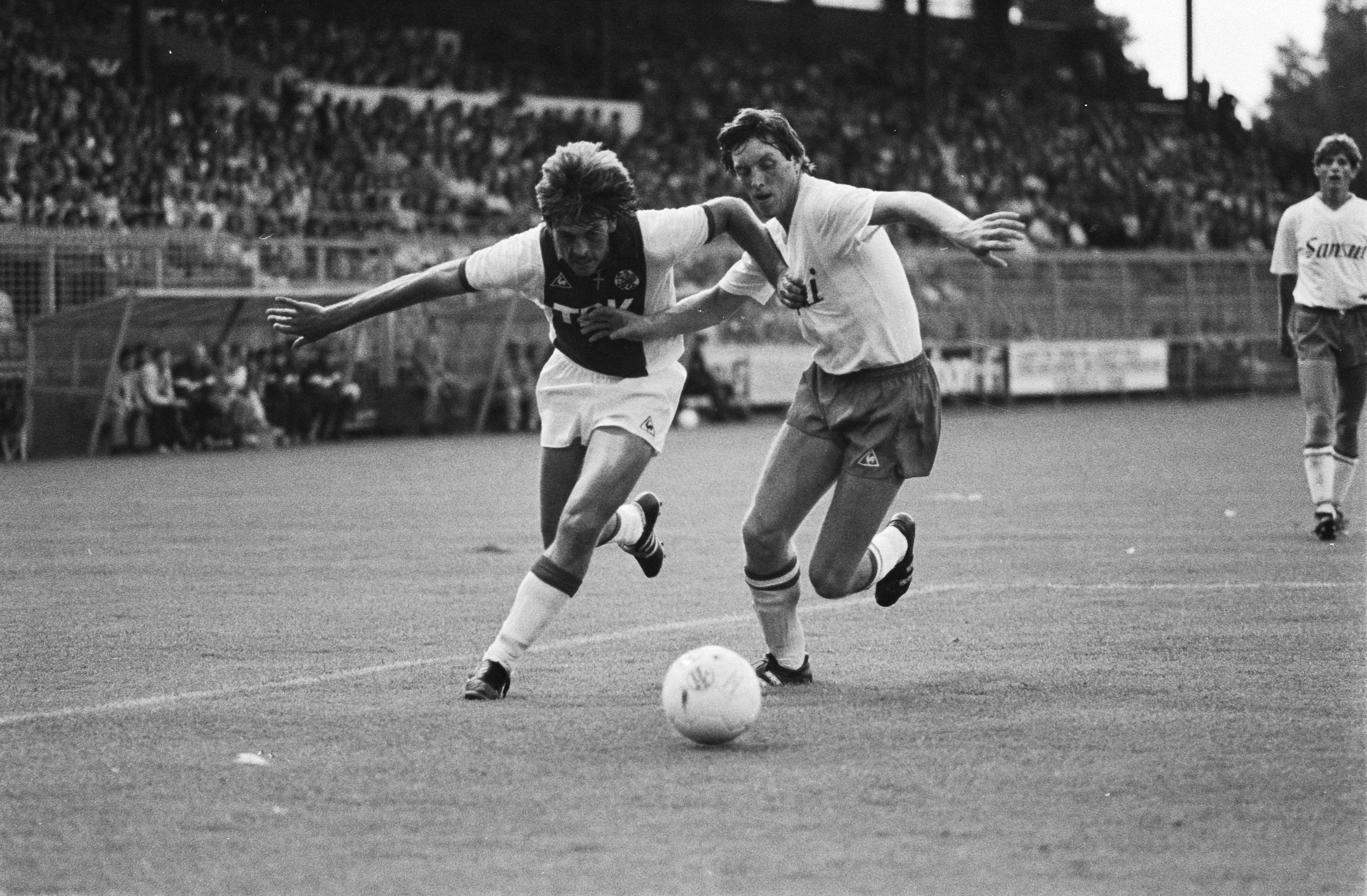
- Gasselich (left) playing for Ajax on 24 August 1983.

Personal information
- Date of birth: 21 December 1955 (age 70)
- Place of birth: Vienna, Austria
- Height: 1.83 m (6 ft 0 in)
- Position: Midfielder

Youth career
- 1970–1973: Austria Wien

Senior career*
Years	Team	Apps	(Gls)
1973–1983	Austria Wien	264	(74)
1983–1985	Ajax	57	(16)
1985–1986	LASK Linz	23	(7)
1986–1988	Wiener SC	64	(11)
1988–1989	Grazer AK	30	(3)
1989–1990	Kremser SC	17	(1)
1990–1991	SR Donaufeld Wien		

International career
1978–1984	Austria	19	(3)
- * Club domestic league appearances and goals

Felix Gasselich (born 21 December 1955) is an Austrian former footballer who played as a midfielder for Austria Wien, Ajax, LASK Linz, Wiener SC, Grazer AK, Kremser SC and SR Donaufeld Wien, as well as for the Austrian national side.

== Career ==
Gasselich finished his career in Austria with LASK Linz, Wiener Sport-Club, and Grazer AK the following years.
