= Ernst Baumeister =

Austrian footballer and manager (born 1957)

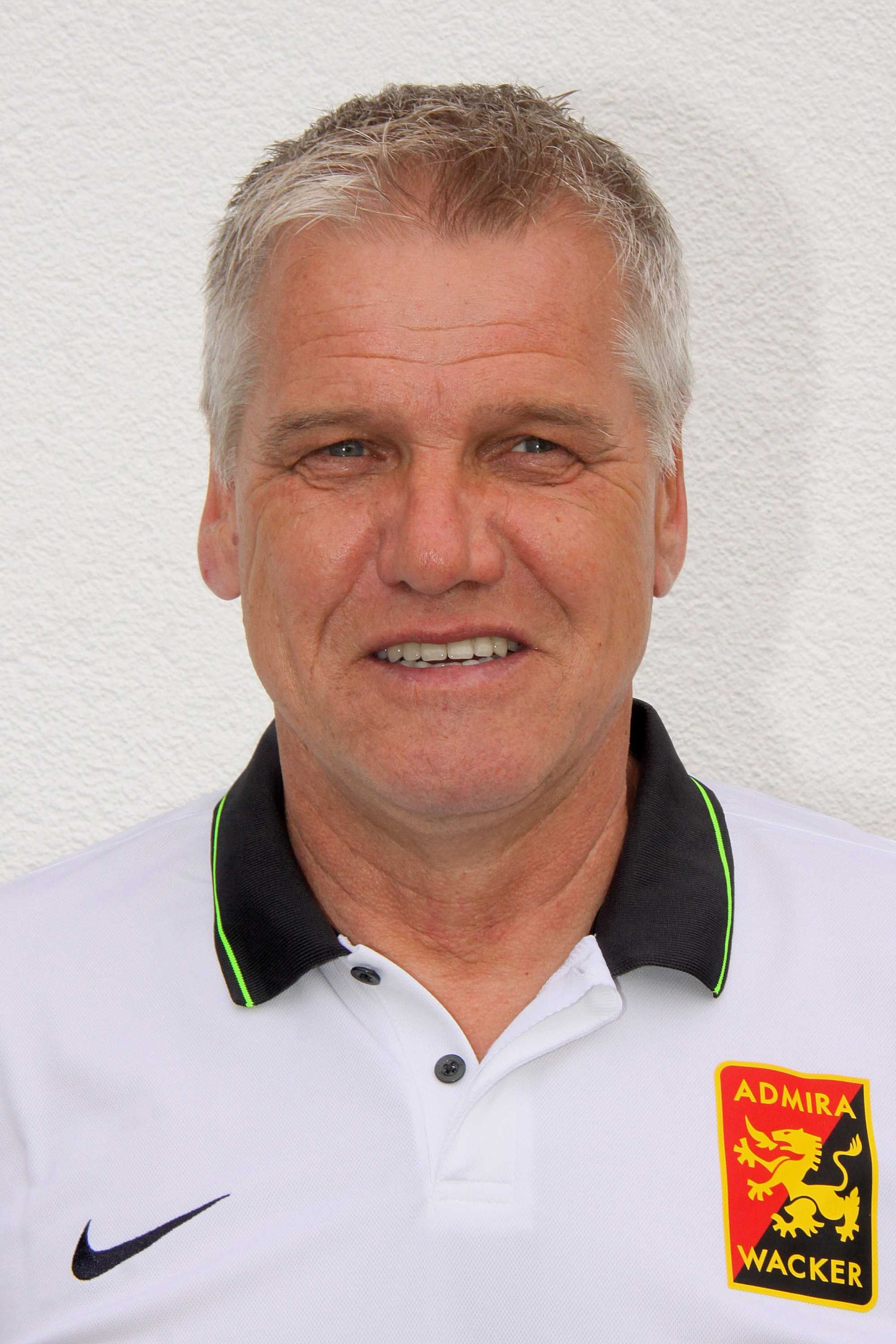

Personal information
- Full name: Ernst Robert Baumeister
- Date of birth: 22 January 1957 (age 69)
- Place of birth: Favoriten, Vienna, Austria
- Height: 1.80 m (5 ft 11 in)
- Position: Defensive midfielder

Youth career
- SV Wienerfeld

Senior career*
Years	Team	Apps	(Gls)
1974–1987	Austria Wien	330	(45)
1987–1989	Admira Wacker	77	(6)
1990	Kremser SC	8	(0)
1990–1992	LASK Linz	67	(14)
Total		415	(65)

International career
1978–1988	Austria	39	(1)

Managerial career
- 2000: Austria Wien (caretaker)
- 2002: SV Pasching (caretaker)
- 2006–2007: Admira Wacker Mödling
- 2008: Admira Wacker Mödling
- 2009–2013: Union Mauer
- 2015–2016: Admira Wacker Mödling
- 2017–2018: Admira Wacker Mödling
- * Club domestic league appearances and goals

Ernst Robert Baumeister (born 22 January 1957) is an Austrian football manager and former player.

== Club career ==
Nicknamed Tschick, Baumeister signed his first professional contract in 1974 with Austria Wien, only for him to stay with them for 13 years and winning 8 league titles. In 1978, he played in the UEFA Cup Winners Cup Final which Austria lost 4–0 to R.S.C. Anderlecht.

In 1987, he moved to city rivals Admira Wacker before retiring at LASK Linz and SV Traun.

== International career ==
Baumeister made his debut for Austria in a May 1978 friendly match against the Netherlands and was a participant at the 1978 FIFA World Cup and 1982 FIFA World Cup. He earned 39 caps in total, scoring 1 goal.

== Honours ==
- Austrian Football Bundesliga (8):
  - 1976, 1978, 1979, 1980, 1981, 1984, 1985, 1986
- Austrian Cup (4):
  - 1977, 1980, 1982, 1986
