= Kremser SC =

Austrian football club, based in Krems

- Full name: Kremser Sportclub
- Nickname: KSC
- Founded: 24 August 1919; 107 years ago
- Ground: Sepp-Doll-Stadion, Krems, Austria
- Capacity: 10,000
- Chairman: Georg Stierschneider
- Manager: Stefan Maierhofer
- League: Regionalliga East
- 2025–26: Regionalliga East, 3rd of 17
Home colours	Away colours

Kremser Sportclub, commonly known as Kremser SC or KSC, is an Austrian football club based in Krems an der Donau in Lower Austria. The club was founded on 24 August 1919 and plays its home matches at the Sepp-Doll-Stadion. Its colours are black and white. The first team competes in the Regionalliga East, the third tier of the Austrian football league system.

Krems won the Austrian amateur championship in 1930 and reached the top flight for the first time in 1956, spending four seasons there. The club's greatest success came in 1988, when it won the Austrian Cup as a second-division side by beating FC Swarovski Tirol on the away goals rule. The victory took Krems into the 1988–89 European Cup Winners' Cup, where it lost to Carl Zeiss Jena in the first round. Promotion followed in 1989, and the club spent three seasons in the Bundesliga with the Argentine 1978 FIFA World Cup winner Mario Kempes in its squad.

Relegation in 1992 began a long decline that took the club to the fifth tier by 2009. Krems returned to the Regionalliga East in 2022 after fifteen years outside the national divisions and has since established itself in the upper half of the table.

== History ==
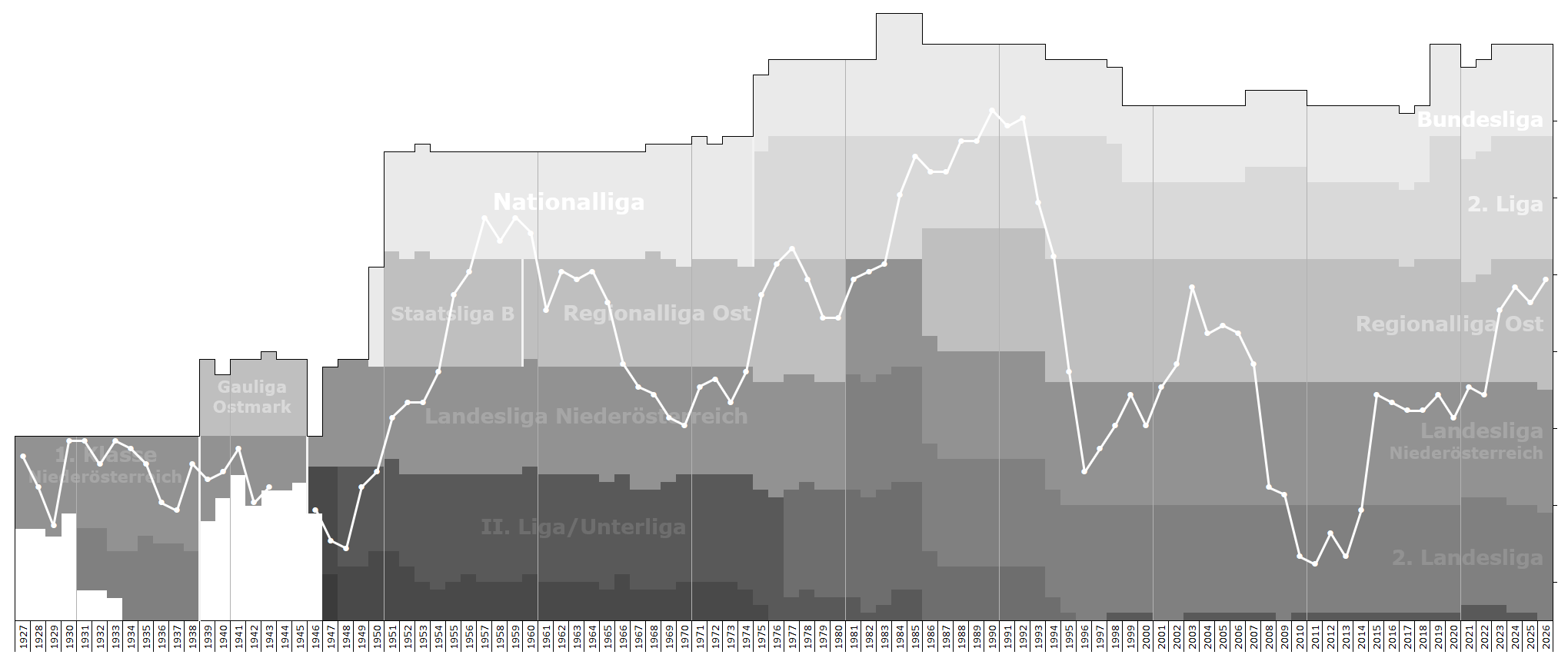
Historical chart of the club's league performance

=== Foundation and early years ===
Organised football in Krems predates the club. A student team was formed in 1909, and a side of students and soldiers calling itself Kremser Rapid followed in 1912. The club itself was founded on 24 August 1919 as 1. Kremser Sport-Club and adopted black and white as its colours. It joined the Lower Austrian football association on 1 October of the same year, and the crest designed in the founding year remains in use. The club briefly carried the name Krems-Steiner SC in the early 1920s, a reference to the neighbouring district of Stein.

The Steiner Sportplatz soon proved too small for the crowds. In 1921 the city of Krems made available a plot beside the railway embankment, and military barracks left over from World War I were cleared. Volunteers built a small ground with a training pitch and running track. The Austrian federation refused to sanction matches without proper changing rooms, so a wooden hut washed up by the Danube flood of February 1923 was salvaged and pressed into service. The first competitive match at the new ground was played on 15 April 1923 and ended in a 4–4 draw with Sturm 19 St. Pölten. The club had overreached itself financially and sold the ground to the city in 1927 to clear its debts.

Krems won three consecutive Lower Austrian championships between 1930 and 1933. In 1930 it also took the Austrian amateur championship, beating FA Turnerbund Lustenau, the forerunner of SC Austria Lustenau, in the deciding matches. As 1. Kremser SC it won the Lower Austrian Cup in 1936, beating ESV Wacker Wiener Neustadt over two legs.

Public money became available for repairs to the ground after the Anschluss in 1938, and the site was renovated in 1940. Football in Krems stopped in 1944 and resumed in the spring of 1946. Fundraising paid for a new ticket office, changing rooms and a main entrance, and the Soviet occupation authorities financed a wooden stand beside the embankment. In 1949 the master builder Sepp Doll was commissioned to draw up plans for a full redevelopment. His scheme was never realised for lack of money, but he later served as the club's long-standing chairman.

=== Rise to the top flight ===
Promotion to the second-tier Staatsliga B followed the 1953–54 season and began a sustained rise. Krems finished as runners-up in 1955–56 and won a promotion play-off against Schwarz-Weiß Bregenz to reach the top division. The first home match in the Staatsliga A was played on 26 August 1956 against Admira Wien and drew 6,000 spectators to a 1–1 draw. On 23 September the club won 2–0 at Austria Wien in front of 32,000. A month later more than 10,000 packed the Kremser Stadion for the visit of Rapid Wien, who won 2–0. The club finished ninth in 1956–57 with an average home attendance of 4,500. It survived four seasons in the top flight before losing a relegation play-off to FC Dornbirn on 10 July 1960.

The city funded a new clubhouse, a groundsman's flat and a new changing block in 1958. Terracing was extended behind both goals and along the embankment side, and the seated area was roofed, so that the ground took on broadly the shape it has today.

Two decades of anonymity followed, with the club moving between the Regionalliga East and the Lower Austrian Landesliga. Krems won the Landesliga at the first attempt after relegation in 1974. It took the Regionalliga East title in 1976 and spent three seasons in the second-tier 2. Division from 1977 to 1980 before dropping back.

=== Revival under Dienst ===
In the summer of 1981 the chairman Erich Hartmann approached the former Rapid Wien striker Robert Dienst, who had been working successfully in the lower divisions. Dienst took charge and in 1982–83 won the Lower Austrian Landesliga by a record margin of eleven points under two points for a win. A qualifying tie against the Burgenland champions SV Neuberg was settled 3–0 at home before 4,000 spectators and 7–1 away. The defence was the team's strength, as the goalkeeper Franz Gartner kept a clean sheet for 810 consecutive minutes and the side conceded only twenty goals all season.

Krems finished eighth of sixteen in the 2. Division as a promoted club in 1983–84. Average attendances of around 1,800 in a town of 22,000 people left the club with a small surplus. It settled into the second tier and developed into one of the division's stronger sides.

=== Cup triumph and European football ===
Floodlights were installed in 1988 and the ground was renamed the Sepp-Doll-Stadion after further improvements. The same year brought the club's greatest success. Under Ernst Weber, Krems reached the Austrian Cup final by beating St. Margarethen 4–0, SC Zwettl 4–1, FC Puch 2–0, Wiener Sport-Club 2–0 and VfB Mödling 3–1. The final was played over two legs against FC Swarovski Tirol, then in their first season under Ernst Happel and widely regarded as the most expensive squad in the country.

The first leg was played at the Sepp-Doll-Stadion on the evening of 24 May 1988 before 9,000 spectators, and Roland Otto and Thomas Janeschitz scored in a 2–0 win. At the Tivoli in Innsbruck on 1 June, Erwin Wolf put Krems ahead in the thirteenth minute in front of nearly 10,000. Robert Wazinger, Andreas Spielmann and Rupert Marko replied for Tirol, but the tie finished 3–3 on aggregate and Krems took the trophy on the away goals rule. It was the first second-division side to win the cup since the competition was reintroduced.

As cup holders Krems met the champions Rapid Wien in the 1988 Austrian Supercup at the Sepp-Doll-Stadion on 16 July 1988. Under the newly appointed Karl Daxbacher the match finished 1–1 after extra time before 6,000 spectators, and Rapid won 3–1 on penalties.

The club made its European debut in the 1988–89 European Cup Winners' Cup against FC Carl Zeiss Jena. Krems lost the first leg 5–0 at the Ernst-Abbe-Sportfeld on 7 September 1988 in front of 9,000 spectators. Studeny scored the only goal of the return leg in Krems on 5 October before 2,500, and the club went out 5–1 on aggregate.

Hans Krankl joined at the age of 35 in the autumn of 1988 and scored three goals before leaving for Austria Salzburg in November. Krems finished the autumn as leaders of the 2. Division and secured promotion through the middle play-off, confirming fourth place and a return to the top flight on 10 June 1989 with a 3–3 home draw against SK Vorwärts Steyr. More than 5,000 spectators celebrated the club's first appearance in the top division for 28 years.

=== Bundesliga years and collapse ===
The former Austria Wien playmakers Ernst Baumeister and Felix Gasselich followed Krankl to Krems. In the summer of 1990 the club signed the 36-year-old Mario Kempes, who had previously played in Austria for First Vienna FC and VSE St. Pölten. Krems finished ninth in 1990–91.

By 1991–92 the squad had thinned. Baumeister, Gasselich and Johann Drabek had retired in 1990, and younger players such as Janeschitz had moved on. The Slovak coach Jozef Obert relied on inexperienced Bundesliga players alongside the forward Paul Perstling and the midfielder Erwin Höld. Kempes managed two goals in eighteen matches in the regular phase. The season's high point came in September 1991, when August Baumühlner scored the only goal of an away win at Rapid Wien for his sole Bundesliga goal. Kempes scored the winner at Sturm Graz soon afterwards. A 6–0 home defeat by FC Stahl Linz remained the club's heaviest top-flight loss. Krems finished tenth of twelve after the 22-round autumn phase and seventh of eight in the middle play-off, and were relegated.

Kempes returned to Argentina, and the club failed to rebuild. Krems finished bottom of the second division in 1994, which ended professional football in the town. It then fell through the Regionalliga East into the Lower Austrian Landesliga. The club won the Landesliga in 2001 to return to the third tier, dropped back in 2007 and reached the fifth-tier 2. Landesliga West in 2008–09, the lowest point in its history.

=== Recovery ===
The financial specialist Georg Stierschneider, a former player and club captain, joined the board in 2009 as an adviser and set about stabilising the club. He later described the position as critical both on the field and off it. Rather than a single financial collapse, the decline had followed the withdrawal of the construction-industry backing that had sustained the successful years.

Krems went through the 2013–14 season without a competitive defeat, won the 2. Landesliga West and returned to the Lower Austrian Landesliga. The following season it finished second behind ASK Ebreichsdorf with only two defeats. In 2015 the club won the Lower Austrian Cup, beating ASK Marienthal 2–2 away and 3–0 at home, which earned a place in the first round of the Austrian Cup.

Several near misses followed before promotion finally came in 2022. A shortage of entrants meant that the last Regionalliga East place was decided by a three-team play-off between Krems, SC/ESV Parndorf and SV Donau. Krems beat Parndorf 7–1 at home before 2,000 spectators and then drew 1–1 in Vienna, Kurt Starkl heading an equaliser deep into stoppage time to secure the point that took the club into the third tier for the first time since 2007.

The club finished seventh in its first season back and fourth in 2023–24, when it also submitted its first application for a second-division licence. In July 2024 Krems took the cup holders Sturm Graz to extra time in the first round of the Austrian Cup. Hakan Gökcek scored twice to make it 2–2 after ninety minutes before Jon Gorenc Stanković and Mika Biereth settled the tie in Sturm's favour in front of around 7,000 spectators.

Since 2024 the first team has been registered as a joint team and appears in league tables under a combined name. The partnership with SV Rehberg ran for two seasons and was ended by mutual agreement in May 2026. SC Getzersdorf took Rehberg's place from the following season.

Krems led the Regionalliga East at the winter break in 2024–25 and finished third in 2025–26. Head coach Philipp Zulechner was appointed as Jochen Fallmann's successor in the summer of 2026 but left for ASK Voitsberg before taking charge of a competitive match. The former Austria international Stefan Maierhofer, who had ended his playing career at Krems in 2023 and had earlier worked there as player-coach, was appointed on 20 July 2026 in his first post as a head coach.

== Colours and names ==
The club has played in black and white since its foundation. It has appeared under several sponsored names. It was registered as SC Sparkasse Krems when it won the Austrian Cup in 1988 and as SC Steinertor Krems during the 2010s.

== Stadium ==
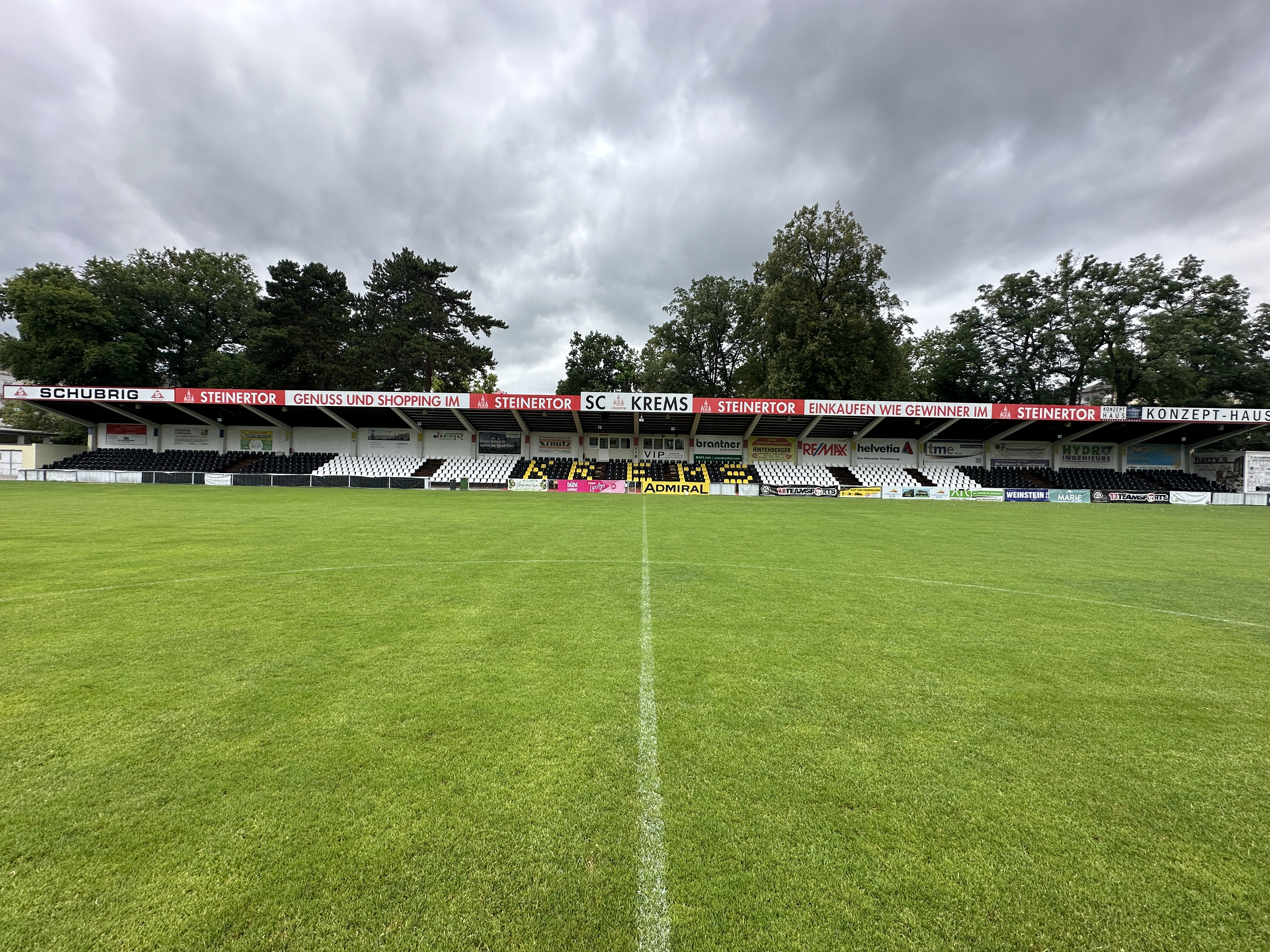
Main stand at the Sepp-Doll-Stadion

Krems have played at the ground on Roseggerstraße since 1923. It was built on land beside the city park that had held temporary army accommodation during the First World War. Known simply as the Kremser Stadion for most of its history, it was renamed the Sepp-Doll-Stadion in 1988 after the builder and long-serving chairman who had overseen its development from 1949 onwards.

A redevelopment in the mid-1980s removed the running track, which had hosted speedway racing in the 1960s and 1970s, and left a capacity of 10,000. The ground has a covered seated stand to the north with more than a thousand seats, and three uncovered terraces to the east, south and west. Because there is no track, spectators stand and sit close to the pitch. The playing surface is grass and the ground has four floodlight pylons.

The record attendance was set on 21 October 1956, when more than 10,000 watched a 2–0 defeat by Rapid Wien.

== Notable former players ==
- (Austria) Ernst Baumeister
- (Austria) Karl Daxbacher
- (Austria) Felix Gasselich
- (Austria) Thomas Janeschitz
- (Argentina) Mario Kempes
- (Austria) Hans Krankl
- (Austria) Stefan Maierhofer
- (Austria) Dominik Starkl

== Managers ==
From	To	Manager
1982	1986	(Austria) Robert Dienst
1987	1988	(Austria) Ernst Weber
1988		(Austria) Karl Daxbacher
1991	1992	(Slovakia) Jozef Obert

From	To	Manager
2022		(Germany) Björn Wagner
	2026	(Austria) Jochen Fallmann
2026	2026	(Austria) Philipp Zulechner
2026		(Austria) Stefan Maierhofer

== Honours ==
National

- Austrian Cup
  - Winners: 1987–88
- Austrian amateur championship
  - Winners: 1930

Regional

- Regionalliga East
  - Winners: 1975–76
- Lower Austrian Landesliga
  - Winners: 1930, 1931, 1933, 1954, 1973–74, 1982–83, 2000–01
- Lower Austrian Cup
  - Winners: 1936, 2015

== European record ==
Season	Competition	Round	Country	Club	Home	Away	Aggregate
1988–89	European Cup Winners' Cup	First round	(East Germany) GDR	FC Carl Zeiss Jena	1–0	0–5	1–5
