= Hans Pirkner =

Austrian footballer (1946–2025)

Personal information
- Full name: Johann Pirkner
- Date of birth: 25 March 1946
- Place of birth: Vienna, Austria
- Date of death: 26 February 2025 (aged 78)
- Height: 1.80 m (5 ft 11 in)
- Position: Forward

Youth career
- SC Simmering
- Floridsdorfer AC

Senior career*
Years	Team	Apps	(Gls)
1966–1967	Admira Energie	4	(1)
1967–1968	Austria Klagenfurt	21	(2)
1968–1969	Admira Energie	15	(9)
1969–1971	Schalke 04	47	(8)
1971–1974	Alpine Donawitz	52	(31)
1974–1978	Austria Wien	128	(62)
1978–1980	First Vienna FC	49	(11)
Total		316	(124)

International career
1969–1978	Austria	20	(4)
- * Club domestic league appearances and goals

Johann "Hans" Pirkner (25 March 1946 – 26 February 2025) was an Austrian footballer who played as a forward.

== Club career ==
Pirkner played for several clubs, including Schalke 04 (1969–1971), Austria Wien (1974–1978) and First Vienna FC. When at Schalke, he was fined for two years due to his involvement in the 1971 Bundesliga scandal. The ban was however lifted by the ÖFB after a year. He ended his professional career after the 1978 World Cup Finals.

== International career ==
Pirkner made his debut for Austria in September 1969 against West Germany and was a participant at the 1978 FIFA World Cup, where he was the oldest squad member. He earned 20 caps, scoring four goals.

== Death ==
Pirkner died on 26 February 2025, at the age of 78.

== Honours ==
Austria Wien

- Austrian Bundesliga: 1975–76, 1977–78
- Austrian Cup: 1976–77

Individual

- Austrian Bundesliga top goalscorer: 1975–76
