= Thomas Janeschitz =

Austrian footballer

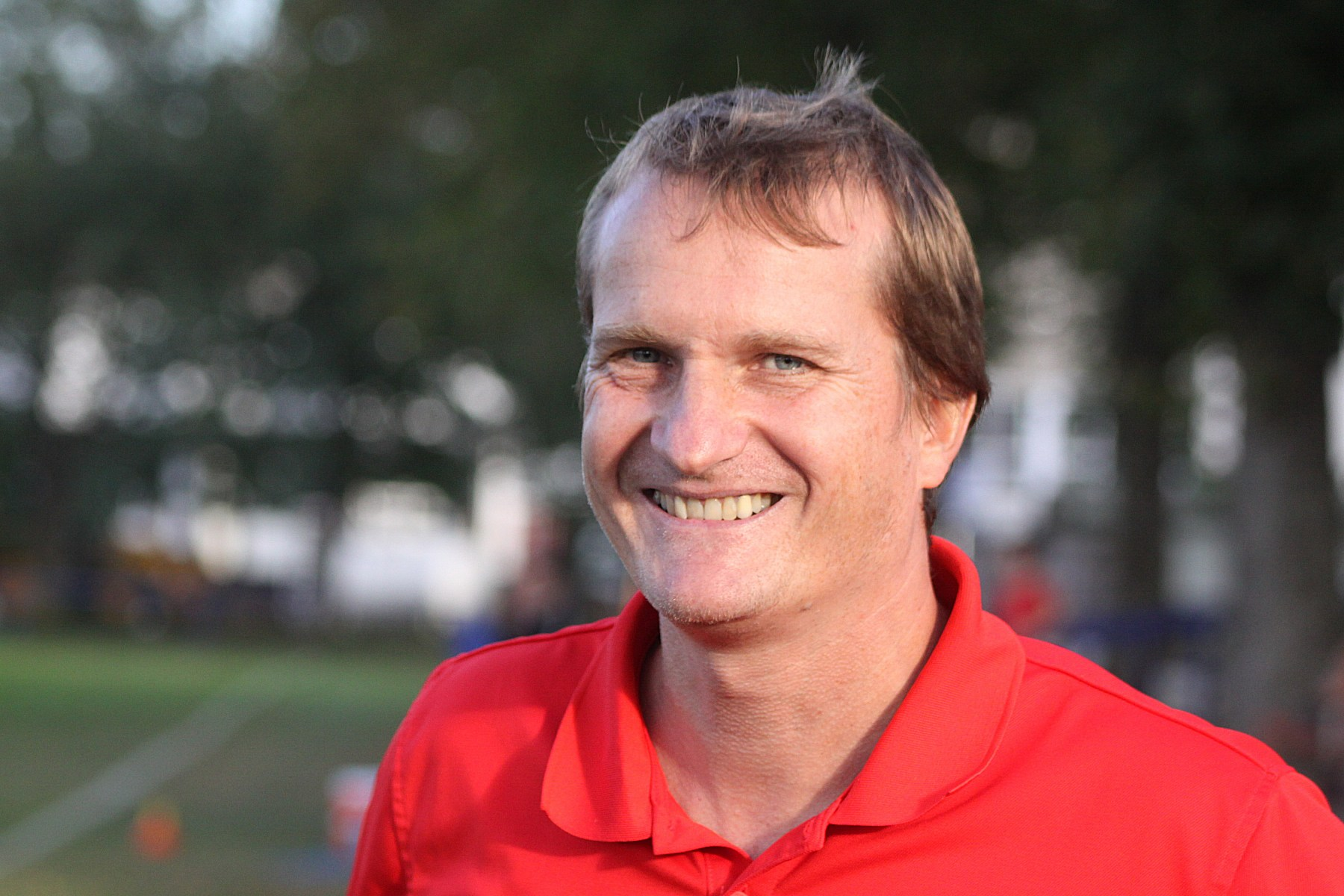
- Janeschitz in 2009

Personal information
- Date of birth: 22 June 1966 (age 60)
- Height: 1.82 m (6 ft 0 in)
- Position: Striker

Youth career
- 1972–1981: Austria Wien
- SV Kagran
- Wiener Sportklub

Senior career*
Years	Team	Apps	(Gls)
1984–1987	Wiener Sport-Club		
1987–1990	Kremser SC		
1990–1993	Wiener Sport-Club		
1993–1997	Tirol Innsbruck		
1997–1998	Austria Wien		

International career
	Austria	1	(0)

Managerial career
- 1999–2001: Rapid Wien (youth team)
- 2001–2002: Admira Wacker
- 2002–2005: Austria Wien (amateur team)
- 2005–2006: Austria Wien (assistant)
- 2006–2008: Austria Wien II
- 2008–2016: Austria (development)
- 2011–2018: Austria (assistant)
- 2018–2020: Basel (assistant)
- 2022–2024: FC Dornbirn
- 2024–2025: SV Horn
- * Club domestic league appearances and goals

Thomas Janeschitz (born 22 June 1966) is an Austrian professional football manager and former player whose last position was the head coach of 2. Liga club SV Horn.
