= Josef Sara =

Austrian footballer

Personal information
- Date of birth: 9 March 1954 (age 72)
- Position: Defender

International career
Years	Team	Apps	(Gls)
1979	Austria	1	(0)

Josef Sara (born 9 March 1954) is an Austrian former footballer who played as a defender. He played in one match for the Austria national football team in 1979.
