= Alberto Martínez (footballer, born 1950) =

Uruguayan footballer

Personal information
- Full name: Alberto Ariel Martínez Piriz
- Date of birth: 30 July 1950
- Place of birth: Rocha, Uruguay
- Date of death: 1 December 2009 (aged 59)
- Place of death: Uruguay
- Position: Midfielder

Senior career*
Years	Team	Apps	(Gls)
1970–1973	Peñarol		
1973–1978	Austria Vienna	144	(26)
1978–1979	Wiener SK	54	(22)
1979–1980	VOEST Linz	18	(5)
1980–1982	Wiener SK	65	(20)
1982–1983	Las Palmas	28	(3)
1983–1985	Favoritner AC	57	(12)
- * Club domestic league appearances and goals

Alberto Ariel Martínez Piriz (30 July 1950 – 1 December 2009) was an Uruguayan professional footballer who played in Austria for Austria Vienna.

== Club career ==
Martínez, who played as a midfielder, participated in the 1978 European Cup Winners' Cup Final for Austria Vienna. Martínez died on 1 December 2009 of heart failure, at the age of 59.

== Personal life ==
Martínez held Austrian citizenship. His son is the footballer Sebastián Martínez who obtained two international caps for Austria.
