= Franz Weiss =

Franz Weiss or Weiß may refer to:

- Franz Weiss (violist), Austrian violinist and viola player
- Franz Weiß (politician), German politician
