= Alfred Gassner =

Austrian footballer (born 1947)

Personal information
- Date of birth: 2 January 1947 (age 79)
- Position: Forward

Senior career*
Years	Team	Apps	(Gls)
1970–1972	First Vienna FC	56	(19)
1972–1980	Admira/Wacker	191	(45)
Total		247	(64)

International career
1971–1976	Austria	3	(0)
- * Club domestic league appearances and goals

Alfred Gassner (born 2 January 1947) is an Austrian former footballer who played as a forward for Admira/Wacker and First Vienna FC. He made three appearances for the Austria national team from 1971 to 1976.
