= Thomas Parits =

Austrian footballer and manager

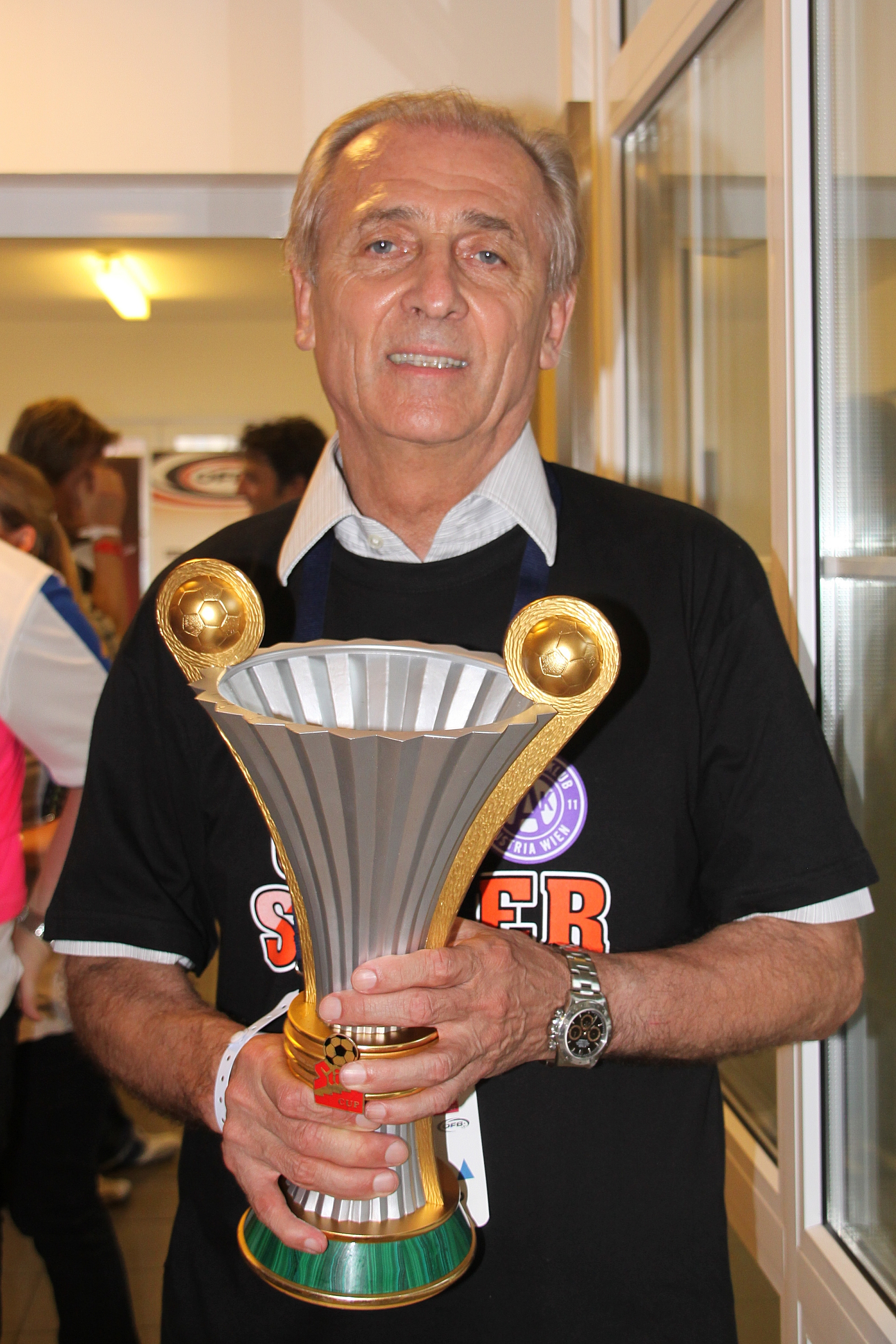

Personal information
- Date of birth: 7 October 1946 (age 80)
- Place of birth: Siegendorf, Austria
- Height: 1.78 m (5 ft 10 in)
- Position: Striker

Youth career
- ASV Siegendorf

Senior career*
Years	Team	Apps	(Gls)
1964–1970	FK Austria Wien	141	(45)
1970–1971	1. FC Köln	29	(5)
1971–1974	Eintracht Frankfurt	71	(18)
1974–1977	Granada CF	82	(7)
1977–1979	FK Austria Wien	61	(37)
1979–1981	VÖEST Linz	45	(10)

International career
1966–1973	Austria	27	(5)

Managerial career
- 1982–1983: SC Neusiedl am See
- 1984–1985: FK Austria Wien
- 1986–1987: FK Austria Wien
- 1988–1990: VSE St. Pölten
- 1990–1991: Admira Wacker
- * Club domestic league appearances and goals

Thomas Parits (born 7 October 1946) is a former international Austrian football player and manager.

Currently, he is working as the sporting director of FK Austria Wien.
