= SKN St. Pölten =

Austrian football club, based in Sankt Pölten

- Full name: Sportklub Niederösterreich St. Pölten
- Founded: June 2000; 26 years ago
- Ground: NV Arena
- Capacity: 8,000
- Chairman: Helmut Schwarzl
- Manager: Cem Sekerlioglu
- League: 2. Liga
- 2025–26: 2. Liga, 2nd of 16
- Website: www.skn-stpoelten.at
Home colours	Away colours

Sportklub Niederösterreich St. Pölten is an Austrian football club from Sankt Pölten, capital of the Austrian state of Lower Austria. St. Pölten currently play in the Austrian Football Second League, the second tier of the Austrian football league system.

== History ==
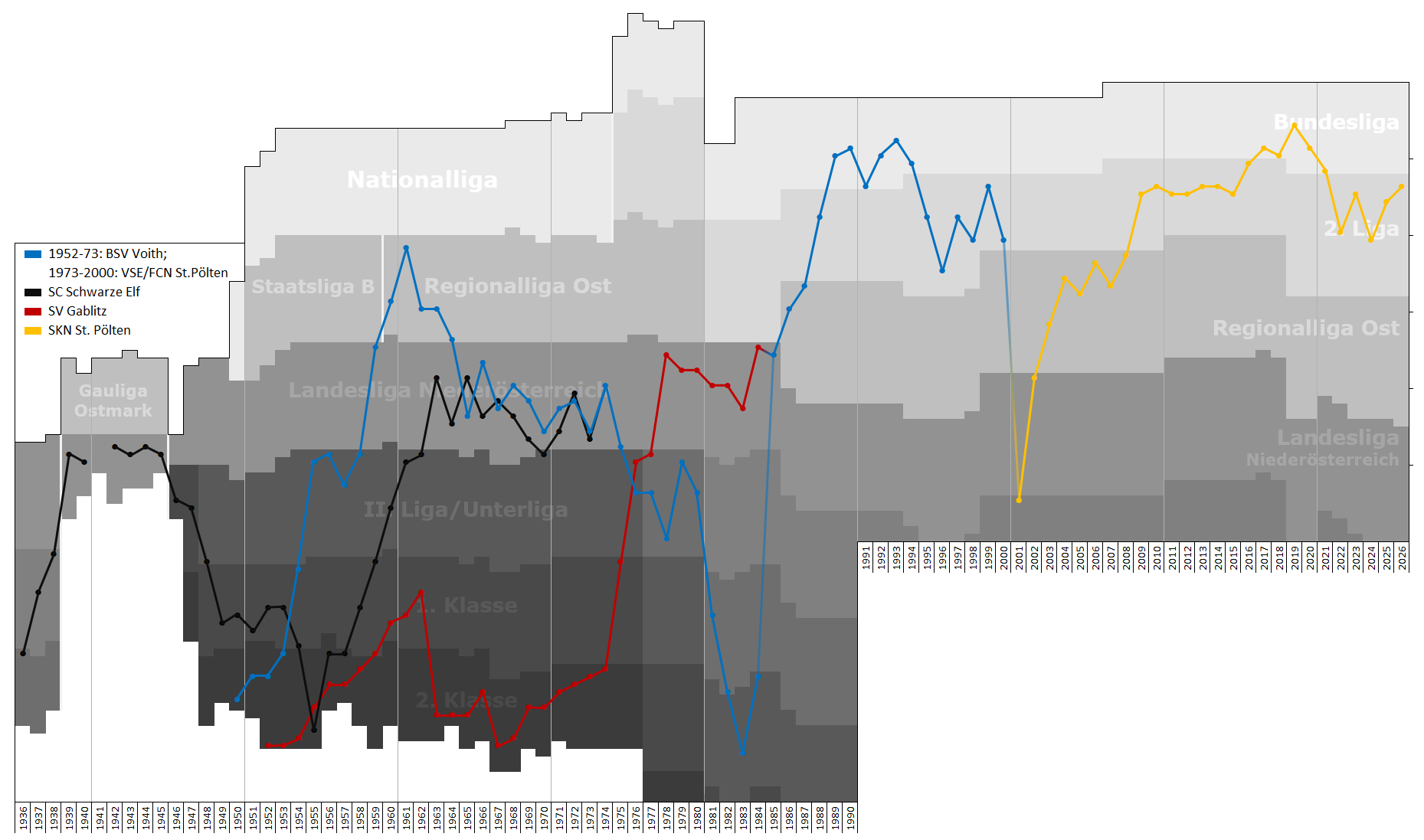
Historical chart of league performance of SKN St. Pölten and their predecessor

SKN St. Pölten were formed after the dissolution of their unofficial predecessor FCN St. Pölten (formerly VSE St. Pölten) in June 2000. The new club took over all FCN St. Pölten infrastructure, including the stadium and the Bundesliga junior center. Although the normal rules state that new clubs must start in the lowest possible division, due to the acquisition of the academy system, SKN St. Pölten were allowed to participate in the 2nd League West, the fifth level of Austrian football.

In their first season in existence (the 2000–01 season), the team won the 2nd League championship, and were therefore promoted to the fourth tier. In the 2001–02 season, SKN St. Pölten won their second successive title and hence were promoted into the Regional League East. In the same year, they also appeared in the final of the Lower Austria Cup, but were beaten by Theresienfeld.

In the 2002–03 season, the team finished twelfth, but improved the following year to finish in fourth. In the 2004–05 season, the club attained sixth place in the league and had a run in the ÖFB Cup which included victories over SV Wörgl (3–0), SW Bregenz (2–1) and a sensational 5–1 victory against Austria Salzburg in the third round. In the quarter-finals, St. Pölten, were soundly beaten by Austria Wien 6–0.

St. Pölten finally achieved their third promotion in the 2007–08 season, going 24 games unbeaten during one period of the season. They have since remained in the Austrian Football First League, finishing four times in 5th (2008–09, 2010–11, 2011–12 and 2014–15) and three times in 4th (2009–2010, 2012–13, 2013–14).

During the 2013–14 season, the club reached the final of the Austrian Cup for the first time in their history. In the final, St. Pölten played Red Bull Salzburg but failed to repeat their stunning third round victory from 2002 to 2003, losing 4–2. However, they qualified for the 2014–15 UEFA Europa League as Red Bull Salzburg had already qualified for the 2014–15 UEFA Champions League by virtue of winning the Austrian Football Bundesliga. In the second qualifying round they played Botev Plovdiv of Bulgaria, winning 3–2 on aggregate after losing the first leg 2–1. In the third qualifying round they played PSV Eindhoven, losing 2–4 on aggregate, thus ending their first foray into a continental competition.

St. Pölten achieved promotion into the Austrian Bundesliga by winning the First League in 2015–16.

== Honours ==
- Austrian Football First League
  - Winners: 2015–16
- Austrian Cup
  - Runners-up: 2013–14

== European record ==
Season	Competition	Round	Club	Home	Away	Aggregate
2014–15	UEFA Europa League	2Q	(Bulgaria) Botev Plovdiv	2–0	1–2	3–2
2014–15	UEFA Europa League	3Q	(Netherlands) PSV Eindhoven	2–3	0–1	2–4

Notes

- 2Q: Second qualifying round
- 3Q: Third qualifying round

== Current squad ==
As of 13 April, 2026

Note: Flags indicate national team as defined under FIFA eligibility rules; some limited exceptions apply. Players may hold more than one non-FIFA nationality.

No.	Pos.	Nation	Player
1	GK	AUT	Christopher Knett
2	DF	GER	Stefan Thesker
5	DF	AUT	Lukas Buchegger
7	FW	AUT	Winfred Amoah
8	MF	AUT	Christoph Messerer
9	FW	AUT	Bernd Gschweidl
10	MF	GER	Marc Stendera
11	FW	AUT	Marco Hausjell
14	MF	AUT	Dorian-Peter Kasparek
15	DF	NOR	Sondre Skogen
17	FW	AUT	Mateo Zilic
18	DF	AUT	Timo Altersberger
20	DF	AUT	Julian Halmich
21	MF	AUT	Max Kleinbruckner

No.	Pos.	Nation	Player
22	MF	SEN	El Hadj Mané
23	DF	LUX	Dirk Carlson
24	GK	AUT	Erik Baranyai-Ulvestad
25	GK	AUT	Paul Scharner
26	DF	AUT	Aleksandar Borković
30	FW	NGR	Reinhard Young
32	GK	AUT	Marcel Kurz
33	FW	AUT	Valentin Ferstl
34	MF	AUT	Leomend Krasniqi
43	MF	AUT	Nemanja Čelić
70	FW	AUT	Marco Djuricin
77	MF	AUT	Din Barlov
97	FW	MNE	Filip Perović

=== Out on loan ===
Note: Flags indicate national team as defined under FIFA eligibility rules; some limited exceptions apply. Players may hold more than one non-FIFA nationality.

No.	Pos.	Nation	Player

== Youth work ==
SKN St. Pölten currently has ten youth teams between for children from the age of 7 to 15, with a total of 150 children and youths. In addition to the junior teams, the club have a second team (SKN II), who play their games in the Mid Western League, with the squad mostly consisting of squad players under the age of 18.

== Sponsors ==
Under the sponsorship of the furniture store Leiner, the club was known as Leiner SKN St. Pölten until 2005. With the introduction of staff24 GmbH, the club changed its name in 2006 to SKN staff24 St. Pölten.

== Coaching staff ==
Position	Name
Manager	(Turkey) Tuğberk Tanrıvermiş
Assistant Manager	(Sweden) (Kosovo) Albin Sheqiri
Assistant Manager	(Austria) Daniel Schütz
Goalkeeping Coach	(Austria) Thomas Vollnhofer
Fitness Coach	(Spain) Mauro Zanoguera
Sporting Director	(Austria) Christoph Freitag
Technical Director	(Japan) Masaki Morass
Director of Development	(Austria) Mario Anfang
Board Member	(Austria) Thomas Nentwich
Chief Financial Officer	(Austria) Matthias Gebauer
Team Manager	(Austria) Mario Batoha

== Manager history ==
As of 29 December 2024

Years	Manager
2000–02	(Austria) Karl Daxbacher
2002–03	(Austria) Horst Kirasitsch
2003–04	(Austria) Frenkie Schinkels
2005–06	(Austria) Günther Wessely
2006	(Austria) Peter Benes
2006–07	(Austria) Walter Hörmann
2007–13	(Austria) Martin Scherb
2013	(Austria) Thomas Nentwich
2013–14	(Austria) Gerald Baumgartner
2014	(Austria) Herbert Gager
2014–15	(Austria) Michael Steiner
2015	(Austria) Jochen Fallmann
2015–16	(Austria) Karl Daxbacher
2016–17	(Austria) Jochen Fallmann
2017–18	(Austria) Oliver Lederer
2018	(Austria) Dietmar Kühbauer
2018	(Germany) Marcel Ketelaer
2018–19	(Serbia) Ranko Popović
2019–20	(Germany) Alexander Schmidt
2020–21	(Austria) Robert Ibertsberger
2021	(Austria) Georg Zellhofer
2021	(Austria) Gerald Baumgartner
2021–23	(Austria) Stephan Helm
2023	(Germany) Jan Schlaudraff
2023–24	(Austria) Philipp Semlic
2024	(Austria) Christoph Witamwas
2024	(Bulgaria) Aleksandar Gitsov
2024–	(Turkey) Tuğberk Tanrıvermiş
