= Peter Koncilia =

Austrian footballer

Personal information
- Date of birth: 22 July 1949 (age 77)
- Place of birth: Klagenfurt, Austria
- Position: Midfielder

Senior career*
Years	Team	Apps	(Gls)
1970	Austria Klagenfurt		
1970–1971	Amateure Wattens		
1971–1972	FC Wacker Innsbruck		
1972	EC KAC		
1972–1976	Austria Klagenfurt		
1976–1979	FC Wacker Innsbruck		
1979–1980	OFI	18	(4)
1980–1981	SPG Innsbruck		
1981–1982	Kansas City Comets		

International career
1975–1977	Austria	6	(0)
- * Club domestic league appearances and goals

Peter Koncilia (born 22 July 1949) is an Austrian footballer. He played in six matches for the Austria national football team from 1975 to 1977. His elder brother Friedl was their country's regular goalkeeper for over a decade.
