= Karl Daxbacher =

Austrian footballer and manager

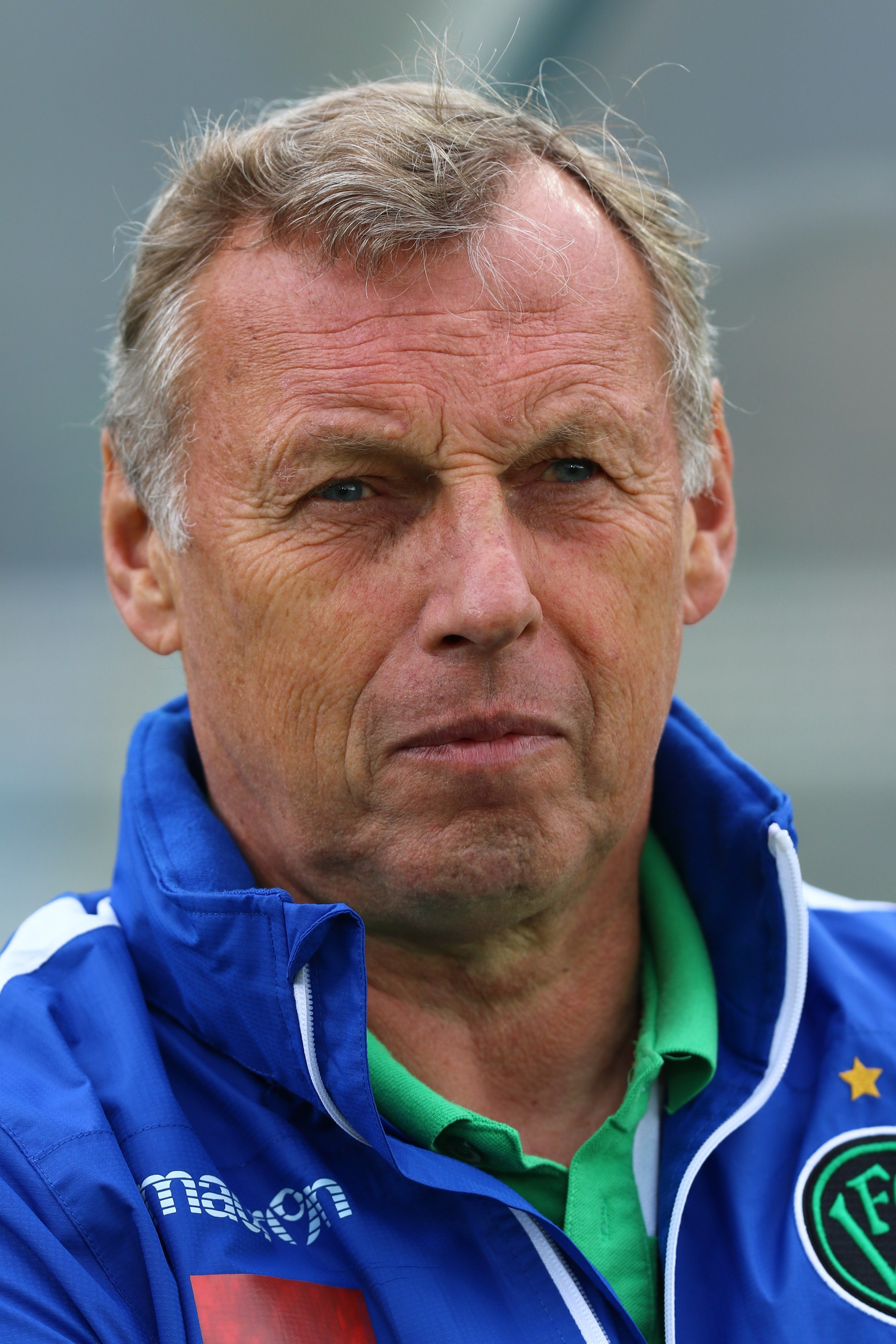

Personal information
- Date of birth: 15 April 1953 (age 73)
- Place of birth: St. Pölten, Austria
- Height: 1.85 m (6 ft 1 in)
- Position: Midfielder

Youth career
- ASV Statzendorf
- Kremser SC

Senior career*
Years	Team	Apps	(Gls)
1971–1985	FK Austria Wien	393	(42)

International career
1972–1976	Austria	6	(0)

Managerial career
- 1988: Kremser SC
- Leistungszentrum St. Pölten
- ASV Statzendorf
- 1994–1995: SV Horn
- 1997–1999: SV Würmla
- 2000–2002: SKN St. Pölten
- 2002–2006: FK Austria Wien II
- 2006–2008: LASK Linz
- 2008–2011: FK Austria Wien
- 2012–2015: LASK Linz
- 2015–2016: SKN St. Pölten
- 2017–2019: Wacker Innsbruck
- * Club domestic league appearances and goals

Karl Daxbacher (born 15 April 1953) is an Austrian football manager and a former player.

== Private ==
Daxbacher was born in St. Pölten, Austria, in 1953. He has four daughters.

== Playing career ==
Daxbacher started his career at the ASV Statzendorf (close to St. Pölten) at the age of 15. After having played for Kremser SC for one season, he switched to FK Austria Wien in 1971. During the next 14 years he played about 400 national, and 40 international games for this team, as well as 6 games for the Austria national football team. In 1985, he switched to Kremser SC again (in the second highest division), where he ended his active career in 1986.

== Coaching career ==
Daxbacher has been working as a coach for SV Horn, SKN St. Pölten, FK Austria Wien II, LASK Linz, and Austria Wien.

Austria Wien hired Daxbacher for the 2008–09 season and sacked him on 22 December 2011. Austria Wien had one league win in their last nine league matches at the time of the sacking.

On 12 June 2012, he returned to LASK Linz. He was sacked on 16 March 2015. He had won two of his last eight matches and lost one of his last six. Martin Hiden was named interim head coach.

== Coaching record ==
As of 27 May 2016

Team	From	To	Record								
Team	From	To	G	W	D	L	GF	GA	GD	Win %	Ref.
Kremser SC	1 July 1988	15 January 1989	3	1	1	1	2	6	−4	33.33	
SV Horn	20 September 1994	30 June 1995	—								
SV Würmla	22 October 1998	19 November 1999	47	20	11	16	77	59	+18	42.55	-
SKN St. Pölten	1 July 2000	30 June 2002	30	21	4	5	70	23	+47	70.00	-
Austria Wien (A)	1 July 2002	31 May 2006	132	62	36	34	231	158	+73	46.97	
LASK Linz	1 June 2006	20 May 2008	72	40	15	17	137	89	+48	55.56	
Austria Wien	1 June 2008	22 December 2011	163	80	43	40	282	198	+84	49.08	
LASK Linz	12 June 2012	16 March 2015	95	61	21	13	213	72	+141	64.21	
SKN St. Pölten	1 June 2015	-	41	30	2	9	68	34	+34	73.17	
Total			506	274	118	114	933	557	+376	54.15	—

== Honours ==
=== As player ===
- Austrian champion: 7 times (all with FK Austria Wien).
- Austrian Cup winner: 4 times (all with FK Austria Wien).
- UEFA Cup Winners' Cup finalist: 1 time (FK Austria Wien).

=== As manager ===
- Austrian Regional League East winner (3rd highest division): 1 time (FK Austria Wien II).
- Austrian Football First League winner (2nd highest division): 3 times (LASK Linz, SKN St. Pölten, Wacker Innsbruck ).
- Austrian Cup winner: 1 time (FK Austria Wien).
