= Gernot Jurtin =

Austrian footballer

Personal information
- Full name: Gernot Jurtin
- Date of birth: 9 October 1955
- Place of birth: Scheifling, Austria
- Date of death: 5 December 2006 (aged 51)
- Place of death: Altenmarkt im Pongau, Austria
- Position: Forward

Senior career*
Years	Team	Apps	(Gls)
1974–1987	Sturm Graz	373	(119)

International career
1979–1983	Austria	12	(1)
- * Club domestic league appearances and goals

Gernot Jurtin (9 October 1955 – 5 December 2006) was an Austrian football player, and a legend amongst Sturm Graz fans.

== Club career ==
Jurtin joined Sturm Graz in the summer of 1974 under coach Karl Schlechta and immediately forced his way into the starting eleven. One of his finest seasons came in 1980/81 when he scored 20 goals in the Bundesliga including five in a 7–0 win against Wiener Sportclub on 5 June 1981. He formed a prolific strike partnership with Bozo Bakota. By the time Jurtin left Sturm Graz in 1987, he had made 373 appearances for them, scoring 119 league goals. The blond-haired number 11 was the first Graz player to break the 100-goal barrier in the league.

== International career ==
Between 1979 and 1983, he won 12 caps for Austria, scoring one goal. He made two appearances for them in the 1982 FIFA World Cup, against Chile and Northern Ireland.

== Death ==
On 5 December 2006, he died of cancer at the age of 51.

== Honours ==
- Austrian Bundesliga Top Goalscorer (1):
  - 1981
