= 1983–84 FK Austria Wien season =

Austria Wien
1983-84 season
- Manager: Václav Halama
- Stadium: Franz Horr Stadium
- Bundesliga: 1st
- ÖFB-Cup: Runners-up
- UEFA Cup: Quarter-finals
- Top goalscorer: League: Tibor Nyilasi (26 goals); All: Tibor Nyilasi (43 goals)
- Average home league attendance: 5,473
- Biggest win: 16–0 v. ASK-BSC Bruck/Leitha (A); 30 August 1983
- Biggest defeat: 1-4 v. Rapid Wien (A); 7 April 1984

Austria Wien finished the 1983-84 edition of the Bundesliga with 47 points, the same as city rivals Rapid Wien, but won the title due to more goals scored in favor. They would lose the Austrian Cup to Rapid in the finals. At the UEFA Cup, they defeated Aris Bonnevoie, Laval and Inter Milan in the first three rounds of the competition, but lost to eventual competition winners Tottenham Hotspur in the quarter-finals.

This season marked the return of Herbert Prohaska to the club, having played at Inter and A.S. Roma for the last three years.

== Squad ==
Note: Flags indicate national team as defined under FIFA eligibility rules; some limited exceptions apply. Players may hold more than one non-FIFA nationality.

No.	Pos.	Nation	Player
—	GK	AUT	Reinhard Beer
—	GK	AUT	Friedrich Koncilia
—	GK	AUT	Franz Wohlfahrt
—	DF	AUT	Josef Degeorgi
—	DF	AUT	Robert Frind
—	DF	AUT	Erich Obermayer
—	DF	AUT	Robert Sara
—	DF	AUT	Franz Zore
—	MF	AUT	Ernst Baumeister
—	MF	AUT	Karl Daxbacher
—	MF	AUT	Friedrich Drazan
—	MF	HUN	István Magyar
—	MF	YUG	Džemal Mustedanagić
—	MF	HUN	Tibor Nyilasi
—	MF	AUT	Herbert Prohaska

No.	Pos.	Nation	Player
—	FW	AUT	Alfred Drabits
—	FW	AUT	Tino Jessenitschnig
—	FW	AUT	Andreas Ogris
—	FW	AUT	Toni Polster

== Competitions ==
=== Bundesliga ===
==== League table ====
Pos	Team	Pld	W	D	L	GF	GA	GD	Pts	Qualification or relegation
1	FK Austria Wien	30	21	5	4	85	29	+56	47	Qualification to European Cup first round
2	SK Rapid Wien	30	19	9	2	71	18	+53	47	Qualification to Cup Winners' Cup first round
3	Linzer ASK	30	17	8	5	54	25	+29	42	Qualification to UEFA Cup first round
4	FC Wacker Innsbruck	30	13	11	6	54	31	+23	37	Qualification to UEFA Cup first round
5	SK Sturm Graz	30	15	7	8	52	43	+9	37	

Source: bundesliga.at
Rules for classification: 1) points; 2) goal difference; 3) number of goals scored.

==== Matches ====
20 August 1983 1	SC Neusiedl	0-2	Austria Wien	Sportplatz, Neusiedl am See
16:00		Report	Nyilasi 40'; Polster 82'	Attendance: 3,000; Referee: Adolf Mathias

27 August 1983 2	Austria Wien	5-0	Austria Salzburg	Franz Horr Stadium, Vienna
16:00	Drabits 21', 31', 50'; Nyilasi 28', 53'	Report		Attendance: 5,000; Referee: Alfred Wieser

3 September 1983 3	SV St. Veit	1-5	Austria Wien	SV-Stadion PrinzhoferstraßeSt, St. Veit an der Glan
16:00	Burger 43'	Report	Drazan 21'; Nyilasi 32', 51', 76'; Drabits 54'	Attendance: 6,000; Referee: Horst Brummeier

11 September 1983 4	Austria Wien	0-0	LASK Linz	Franz Horr Stadium, Vienna
16:00		Report		Attendance: 5,000; Referee: Gerald Losert

17 September 1983 5	Favoritner	1-2	Austria Wien	FavAC-Platz, Vienna
16:00	Martínez 74'	Report	Drabits 37'; Nyilasi 54'	Attendance: 6,800; Referee: Heinz Fahnler

24 September 1983 6	Austria Wien	0-0	Rapid Wien	Praterstadion, Vienna
16:00		Report		Attendance: 28,000; Referee: Franz Wöhrer

1 October 1983 7	Admira Wacker	1-4	Austria Wien	Bundesstadion, Maria Enzersdorf
16:00	Szostakowski 90'	Report	Magyar 4', 84'; Baumeister 49'; Drabits 86'	Attendance: 6,000; Referee: Helmut Kohl

8 October 1983 8	Austria Wien	8-3	Grazer AK	Franz Horr Stadium, Vienna
15:30	Prohaska 7', 86'; Daxbacher 20'; Magyar 49'; Nyilasi 54', 69', 80'; Drabits 62'	Report	Koncilia 6' (o.g.); Koschack 49'; Hierzer 83'	Attendance: 4,500; Referee: Franz Bogendorfer

14 October 1983 9	SC Eisenstadt	0-2	Austria Wien	Lindenstadion, Eisenstadt
19:00		Report	Daxbacher 37'; Magyar 77'	Attendance: 6,000; Referee: Horst Brummeier

22 October 1983 10	Austria Wien	3-0	Union Wels	Franz Horr Stadium, Vienna
15:00	Drazan 24'; Nyilasi 53'; Drabits 71'	Report		Attendance: 3,000; Referee: Adolf Wukisewitsch

29 October 1983 11	Austria Klagenfurt	2-0	Austria Wien	Wörthersee Stadion, Klagenfurt
15:00	Ramadhani 22'; Oberacher 60'	Report		Attendance: 7,000; Referee: Gerald Losert

6 November 1983 12	Austria Wien	2-0	VÖEST Linz	Franz Horr Stadium, Vienna
10:30	Magyar 45'; Drabits 86'	Report		Attendance: 4,000; Referee: Wolfgang Klocker

12 November 1983 13	SSW Innsbruck	2-1	Austria Wien	Tivoli Stadion, Innsbruck
14:30	Hattenberger 29', 55'	Report	Drabits 52'	Attendance: 10,000; Referee: Heinz Holzmann

19 November 1983 14	Wiener Sport-Club	1-1	Austria Wien	Gerhard-Hanappi-Stadion, Vienna
14:00	Zach 65'	Report	Polster 56'	Attendance: 8,500; Referee: Franz Wöhrer

30 November 1983 15	Austria Wien	7-1	Sturm Graz	Franz Horr Stadium, Vienna
19:00	Polster 4', 28'; Magyar 19'; Nyilasi 56', 59', 68' (pen.); Degeorgi 84'	Report	Jurtin 46'	Attendance: 7,000; Referee: Franz Latzin

3 December 1983 16	Austria Wien	5-0	SC Neusiedl	Franz Horr Stadium, Vienna
14:00	Nyilasi 17' (pen.), 68'; Daxbacher 40'; Prohaska 51' (pen.), 57'	Report		Attendance: 2,500; Referee: Hubert Forstinger

10 March 1984 17	Austria Salzburg	0-1	Austria Wien	Stadion Lehen, Salzburg
15:30		Report	Polster 56'	Attendance: 5,000; Referee: Heinz Holzmann

17 March 1984 18	Austria Wien	2-1	SV St. Veit	Franz Horr Stadium, Vienna
16:00	Mustedanagić 58'; Nyilasi 65'	Report	Aichholzer 70'	Attendance: 4,000; Referee: Kuno Felder

24 March 1984 19	LASK Linz	1-4	Austria Wien	Linzer Stadion, Linz
16:00	Gröss 28'	Report	Polster 42'; Drabits 50'; Nyilasi 56', 87'	Attendance: 14,000; Referee: Gerald Losert

31 March 1984 20	Austria Wien	1-1	Favoritner	Franz Horr Stadium, Vienna
16:00	Polster 7'	Report	Fürst 77'	Attendance: 3,600; Referee: Fritz Schachhuber

7 April 1984 21	Rapid Wien	4-1	Austria Wien	Gerhard-Hanappi-Stadion, Vienna
16:00	Panenka 38', 76'; Lainer 80'; Kranjčar 88'	Report	Nyilasi 3'	Attendance: 18,000; Referee: Helmut Kohl

14 April 1984 22	Austria Wien	5-1	Admira Wacker	Franz Horr Stadium, Vienna
16:00	Baumeister 41'; Drabits 50', 54'; Polster 63'; Nyilasi 73'	Report	Igesund 53'	Attendance: 4,000; Referee: Franz Wöhrer

20 April 1984 23	Grazer AK	0-0	Austria Wien	Liebenau Stadion, Graz
19:45		Report		Attendance: 5,000; Referee: Heinz Holzmann

28 April 1984 24	Austria Wien	5-1	SC Eisenstadt	Franz Horr Stadium, Vienna
16:00	Polster 1'; Drabits 6', 41'; Nyilasi 69', 84'	Report	Schneider 46'	Attendance: 2,500; Referee: Hubert Forstinger

5 May 1984 25	Union Wels	0-3	Austria Wien
Note: Union Wels was dissolved on February 1, 1984 due to bankruptcy. All of their spring games were forfeited.

11 May 1984 26	Austria Wien	4-2	Austria Klagenfurt	Franz Horr Stadium, Vienna
19:00	Prohaska 6'; Nyilasi 18'; Baumeister 21'; Hrstić 87' (o.g.)	Report	Türmer 24'; Bürgler 30'	Attendance: 3,000; Referee: Wolfgang Klocker

18 May 1984 27	VÖEST Linz	3-2	Austria Wien	Union Stadium, Linz
18:30	Haizinger 23'; Mirnegg 26' (pen.); Wartinger 45'	Report	Polster 40'; Daxbacher 75'	Attendance: 5,2000; Referee: Gerd Adanitsch

25 May 1984 28	Austria Wien	4-1	SSW Innsbruck	Franz Horr Stadium, Vienna
18:30	Polster 10'; Nyilasi 15'; Drabits 41', 63'	Report	Gröss 75'	Attendance: 3,000; Referee: Alfred Wieser

29 May 1984 29	Austria Wien	3-2	Wiener Sport-Club	Franz Horr Stadium, Vienna
18:30	Drabits 52'; Nyilasi 62'; Polster 85'	Report	Abfalterer 37'; Riedl 54'	Attendance: 3,000; Referee: Franz Wöhrer

1 June 1984 30	Sturm Graz	0-3	Austria Wien	Sturm-Platz, Graz
18:30		Report	Obermayer 69'; Drabits 77'; Polster 89'	Attendance: 11,000; Referee: Helmut Kohl

=== ÖFB-Cup ===
30 August 1983 Second round	ASK-BSC Bruck/Leitha	0-16	Austria Wien	Parkstadion, Bruck an der Leitha
17:20		Report	Magyar 1', 30', 63'; Daxbacher 25'; Polster 27', 56', 59', 71', 86'; Prohaska 37'; Nyilasi 41', 49', 76'; Drabits 64', 66', 90'	Attendance: 2,200; Referee: Klaus Adelmann

26 October 1983 Round of 32	Austria Wien	4-0	SV Güssing	Franz Horr Stadium, Vienna
15:00	Magyar 16', 38'; Baumeister 58'; Prohaska 63'	Report		Attendance: 1,500; Referee: Walter Aigner

3 March 1984 Round of 16	ASK Salzburg	0-8	Austria Wien	ASK-Platz Maxglan, Salzburg
19:30		Report	Prohaska 17', 29'; Nyilasi 45', 80'; Mustedanagić 51', 62'; Daxbacher 70'; Baumeister 85'	Attendance: 800; Referee: Josef Spitzl

14 March 1984 Quarter-final	Slovan/HAC	0-5	Austria Wien	Slovanplatz, Vienna
15:00		Report	Nyilasi 10', 11'; Prohaska 16'; Polster 64', 84'	Attendance: 1,500; Referee: Dieter Wedermann

==== Semi-final ====
11 April 1984 First leg	Sturm Graz	2-0	Austria Wien	Sturm-Platz, Graz
17:30	Bakota 82'; Jurnit 85'	Report		Attendance: 4,500; Referee: Arthur Pernkopf

24 April 1984 Second leg	Austria Wien	4-0	Sturm Graz	Franz Horr Stadium, Vienna
19:00	Nyilasi 31'; Drabits 77'; Prohaska 80' (pen.); Polster 82'	Report		Attendance: 4,000; Referee: Frank Latzin

==== Final ====
8 May 1984 First leg	Austria Wien	3-1	Rapid Wien	Praterstadion, Vienna
19:30	Polster 57', 75'; Nyilasi 70'	Report	Kranjčar 58'	Attendance: 11,000; Referee: Franz Wöhrer

15 May 1984 Second leg	Rapid Wien	2-0	Austria Wien	Gerhard-Hanappi-Stadion, Vienna
19:30	Weinhofer 13'; Kienast 24'	Report		Attendance: 20,000; Referee: Heinz Fahnler

=== UEFA Cup ===
==== First round ====
14 September 1983 First leg	Aris Bonnevoie (Luxembourg)	0–5	Austria Wien	Stade Camille Polfer, Luxembourg City
20:00		Report	Drabits 38'; Nyilasi 41'; Prohaska 58', 79', 82' (pen.)	Attendance: 1,125; Referee: Ignace van Swieten (Netherlands)

28 September 1983 Second leg	Austria Wien	10–0	(Luxembourg) Aris Bonnevoie	Franz-Horr-Stadion, Vienna
19:00	Magyar 11'; Daxbacher 17'; Nyilasi 20', 25', 69', 89'; Drabits 23', 34'; Polster 65'; Zore 82'	Report		Attendance: 3,000; Referee: Widukind Herrmann (East Germany)

==== Second round ====
19 October 1983 First leg	Austria Wien	2-0	(France) Laval	Franz-Horr-Stadion, Vienna
19:30	Prohaska 19' (pen.); Magyar 44'	Report		Attendance: 7,000; Referee: Yordan Zhezhov (Bulgaria)

2 November 1983 Second leg	Laval (France)	3-3	Austria Wien	Stade Francis-Le-Basser, Laval
20:00	Sène 21'; Miton 38'; Stéfanini 42'	Report	Baumeister 51', 56'; Pérard 65' (o.g.)	Attendance: 18,000; Referee: George Courtney (England)

==== Third round ====
23 November 1983 First leg	Austria Wien	2-1	(Italy) Inter Milan	Praterstadion, Vienna
19:00	Nyilasi 78', 83'	Report	Muraro 53'	Attendance: 16,000; Referee: John Carpenter (Republic of Ireland)

7 December 1983 Second leg	Inter Milan (Italy)	1-1	Austria Wien	Stadio Giuseppe Meazza, Milan
20:30	Bagni 79'	Report	Magyar 72'	Attendance: 69,659; Referee: Alexis Ponnet (Belgium)

==== Quarter-final ====
7 March 1984 First leg	Tottenham Hotspur (England)	2-0	Austria Wien	White Hart Lane, London
21:00	Archibald 58'; Brazil 67'	Report		Attendance: 34,069; Referee: Edvard Sostarić (Yugoslavia)

21 March 1984 Second leg	Austria Wien	2-2	(England) Tottenham Hotspur	Praterstadion, Vienna
19:30	Prohaska 63' (pen.); Nyilasi 88'	Report	Brazil 12'; Ardiles 82'	Attendance: 31,000; Referee: Adolf Prokop (East Germany)
