= 1983–84 Austrian Football Bundesliga =

66th season of top-tier football league in Austria

Austrian Bundesliga
- Season: 1983–84
- Dates: 19 August 1983 – 1 June 1984
- Champions: FK Austria Wien
- Relegated: SV Sankt Veit; Union Wels; SC Neusiedl
- European Cup: FK Austria Wien
- Cup Winners' Cup: SK Rapid Wien
- UEFA Cup: LASK; FC Wacker Innsbruck
- Goals: 733
- Top goalscorer: Tibor Nyilasi (26)

These are the statistics of Austrian Football Bundesliga in the 1983–84 season.

== Overview ==
The Bundesliga was contested by 16 teams, and FK Austria Wien won the championship. Union Wels was dissolved in February, with only sixteen matches played up to that point. all of their remaining matches were counted as walkovers.

=== Teams and location ===
Location of teams in the 1983–84 Austrian Football Bundesliga

Teams of 1983–84 Austrian Football Bundesliga

- FC Admira/Wacker
- Austria Salzburg
- Austria Wien
- Eisenstadt
- Favoritner AC
- Grazer AK
- Kärnten
- LASK
- Neusiedl
- Rapid Wien
- Sankt Veit
- Sturm Graz
- Union Wels
- VÖEST Linz
- Wacker Innsbruck
- Wiener Sport-Club

== League standings ==
| Pos | Team | Pld | W | D | L | GF | GA | GD | Pts | Qualification or relegation |
|---|---|---|---|---|---|---|---|---|---|---|
| 1 | FK Austria Wien | 30 | 21 | 5 | 4 | 85 | 29 | +56 | 47 | Qualification to European Cup first round |
| 2 | SK Rapid Wien | 30 | 19 | 9 | 2 | 71 | 18 | +53 | 47 | Qualification to Cup Winners' Cup first round |
| 3 | Linzer ASK | 30 | 17 | 8 | 5 | 54 | 25 | +29 | 42 | Qualification to UEFA Cup first round |
| 4 | FC Wacker Innsbruck | 30 | 13 | 11 | 6 | 54 | 31 | +23 | 37 | Qualification to UEFA Cup first round |
| 5 | SK Sturm Graz | 30 | 15 | 7 | 8 | 52 | 43 | +9 | 37 | |
| 6 | FC Admira/Wacker | 30 | 12 | 12 | 6 | 47 | 36 | +11 | 36 | |
| 7 | Austria Klagenfurt | 30 | 12 | 10 | 8 | 55 | 38 | +17 | 34 | |
| 8 | Grazer AK | 30 | 13 | 6 | 11 | 45 | 37 | +8 | 32 | |
| 9 | Wiener Sportclub | 30 | 10 | 7 | 13 | 53 | 52 | +1 | 27 | |
| 10 | SV Austria Salzburg | 30 | 10 | 7 | 13 | 39 | 46 | −7 | 27 | |
| 11 | SC Eisenstadt | 30 | 9 | 7 | 14 | 39 | 49 | −10 | 25 | |
| 12 | VÖEST Linz | 30 | 8 | 9 | 13 | 35 | 47 | −12 | 25 | |
| 13 | Favoritner AC | 30 | 8 | 9 | 13 | 35 | 52 | −17 | 25 | |
| 14 | SV Sankt Veit | 30 | 7 | 7 | 16 | 37 | 59 | −22 | 21 | Qualification to 1984-85 2. Liga |
| 15 | Union Wels | 30 | 4 | 6 | 20 | 22 | 69 | −47 | 14 | Relegated to 1984-85 2. Liga |
| 16 | SC Neusiedl | 30 | 1 | 2 | 27 | 10 | 102 | −92 | 4 | Relegated to 1984-85 2. Liga |

Source: bundesliga.at
Rules for classification: 1) points; 2) goal difference; 3) number of goals scored.

== Results ==
| Home \ Away | ADM | KLA | ASZ | AWI | EIS | FAV | GAK | LIN | NEU | RWI | SVE | STU | WEL | VOE | WKR | WIE |
|---|---|---|---|---|---|---|---|---|---|---|---|---|---|---|---|---|
| Admira/Wacker | | 1–1 | 4–1 | 1–4 | 1–0 | 4–1 | 0–0 | 1–0 | 6–1 | 0–0 | 4–4 | 1–0 | 2–0 | 3–3 | 1–1 | 2–1 |
| Austria Klagenfurt | 1–2 | | 1–1 | 2–0 | 4–1 | 4–1 | 2–1 | 2–2 | 1–0 | 0–1 | 2–1 | 1–1 | 3–0 (Note: Match awarded.) | 3–0 | 1–2 | 6–0 |
| Austria Salzburg | 2–1 | 1–1 | | 0–1 | 3–0 | 4–0 | 0–3 | 0–0 | 5–1 | 0–1 | 3–2 | 1–2 | 3–0 | 1–1 | 1–1 | 2–0 |
| Austria Wien | 5–1 | 4–2 | 5–0 | | 5–1 | 1–1 | 8–3 | 0–0 | 5–0 | 0–0 | 2–1 | 7–1 | 3–0 | 2–0 | 4–1 | 3–2 |
| Eisenstadt | 2–1 | 2–2 | 0–2 | 0–2 | | 0–0 | 1–2 | 1–1 | 3–1 | 0–2 | 0–0 | 1–1 | 2–1 | 1–1 | 1–0 | 1–2 |
| Favoritner AC | 2–2 | 1–1 | 1–0 | 1–2 | 3–0 | | 2–0 | 0–1 | 1–0 | 1–3 | 0–1 | 3–1 | 1–2 | 2–0 | 0–0 | 1–1 |
| Grazer AK | 0–1 | 0–0 | 0–0 | 0–0 | 2–1 | 0–0 | | 1–2 | 6–0 | 3–2 | 2–0 | 1–2 | 3–0 | 2–1 | 3–2 | 2–1 |
| Linzer ASK | 3–1 | 4–1 | 3–1 | 1–4 | 2–0 | 5–1 | 3–1 | | 2–0 | 1–1 | 6–0 | 0–0 | 3–0 | 1–0 | 1–0 | 2–1 |
| Neusiedl | 0–0 | 0–4 | 0–2 | 0–2 | 0–4 | 0–2 | 0–5 | 0–4 | | 2–5 | 0–0 | 0–1 | 0–2 | 0–2 | 0–3 | 1–2 |
| Rapid Wien | 1–1 | 1–0 | 1–2 | 4–1 | 0–0 | 4–0 | 2–0 | 3–1 | 8–0 | | 4–0 | 2–0 | 3–0 | 6–0 | 5–1 | 2–0 |
| St. Veit | 0–1 | 3–3 | 1–0 | 1–5 | 3–5 | 2–1 | 0–1 | 0–0 | 5–0 | 1–3 | | 2–1 | 1–3 | 2–0 | 1–1 | 1–5 |
| Sturm Graz | 0–0 | 2–1 | 4–2 | 0–3 | 2–1 | 6–1 | 3–1 | 1–1 | 5–1 | 1–1 | 2–0 | | 3–0 | 2–1 | 2–1 | 3–0 |
| Union Wels | 0–3 | 2–3 | 2–1 | 0–3 | 0–3 | 2–4 | 1–1 | 1–3 | 0–3 | 2–2 | 0–3 | 0–0 | | 0–3 | 1–1 | 0–3 |
| VOEST Linz | 1–1 | 1–2 | 1–1 | 3–2 | 1–3 | 2–2 | 1–0 | 1–0 | 4–0 | 1–1 | 1–0 | 1–4 | 0–0 | | 2–2 | 3–0 |
| Wacker Innsbruck | 2–1 | 2–0 | 4–0 | 2–1 | 2–0 | 0–0 | 1–0 | 3–1 | 7–0 | 0–0 | 2–2 | 6–0 | 3–0 | 1–0 | | 2–2 |
| Wiener SC | 0–0 | 1–1 | 5–0 | 1–1 | 3–5 | 4–2 | 1–2 | 0–1 | 6–0 | 0–3 | 2–0 | 3–2 | 3–3 | 3–0 | 1–1 | |

Source: austriasoccerat.com
Legend: Blue = home team win; Yellow = draw; Red = away team win.

== Relegation play-offs ==
| Team 1 | Agg. | Team 2 | 1st leg | 2nd leg |
|---|---|---|---|---|
| Donawitzer SV Alpine | 3–1 | SV Sankt Veit | 2–0 | 1–1 |

== Top goalscorers ==
| Rank | Scorer | Club | Goals |
|---|---|---|---|
| 1 | (Hungary) Tibor Nyilasi | FK Austria Wien | 26 |
| 2 | (Austria) Alfred Drabits | FK Austria Wien | 19 |
| 3 | (Czech Republic) Antonín Panenka | SK Rapid Wien | 18 |
| 4 | (Austria) Hans Krankl | SK Rapid Wien | 17 |
| 5 | (Germany) Michael Toppel | LASK | 16 |
| 6 | (Socialist Federal Republic of Yugoslavia) Božo Bakota | SK Sturm Graz | 15 |
| 7 | (Austria) Peter Pacult | Wiener Sport-Club | 14 |
| 8 | (Austria) Toni Polster | FK Austria Wien | 13 |
| 9 | (Austria) Horst Baumgartner | SK Austria Klagenfurt | 12 |
| 10 | (Austria) Gerald Haider | VÖEST Linz | 11 |

== Champion squad ==
FK Austria Wien
Goalkeepers: Friedrich Koncilia (29); Franz Wohlfahrt (1).

Defenders: Robert Sara (29 / 0); Erich Obermayer (16 / 1); Josef Degeorgi (29 / 1); Franz Zore (24 / 0); Robert Frind (2 / 0).
Midfielders: Herbert Prohaska (28 / 5); Ernst Baumeister (24 / 3); Džemal Mustedanagić (Socialist Federal Republic of Yugoslavia) (23 / 1); István Magyar (Hungary) (26 / 6); Karl Daxbacher (26 / 4); Tibor Nyilasi (Hungary) (29 / 26).
Forwards: Toni Polster (23 / 13); Alfred Drabits (28 / 19); Friedrich Drazan (18 / 2); Andreas Ogris (2 / 0); Tino Jessenitschnig (1 / 0).
(league appearances and goals listed in brackets)

Manager: Václav Halama.

== See also ==
- 1983–84 Austrian Cup
