= Adi Pinter =

Austrian football manager

Personal information
- Full name: Adolf Pinter
- Date of birth: 19 January 1948
- Place of birth: Graz, Austria
- Date of death: 20 May 2016 (aged 68)
- Place of death: Austria

Managerial career
- Years: Team
- 1980: Lüttringhausen
- FC Vilshofen
- 1986: SpVgg Bayreuth
- 1987–1988: Grazer AK
- 1989–1990: Grazer AK
- 1991–1992: Wiener Sport-Club
- 1993: Kremser SC
- 1999: SC Weismain-Obermain
- 2000: Lech Poznań
- 2010: NK Sesvete
- 2011: FC Juniors OÖ
- 2012: DSV Leoben

Adolf "Adi" Pinter (19 January 1948 – 20 May 2016) was an Austrian football manager.
