= Heimo Kump =

Austrian football manager (born 1968)

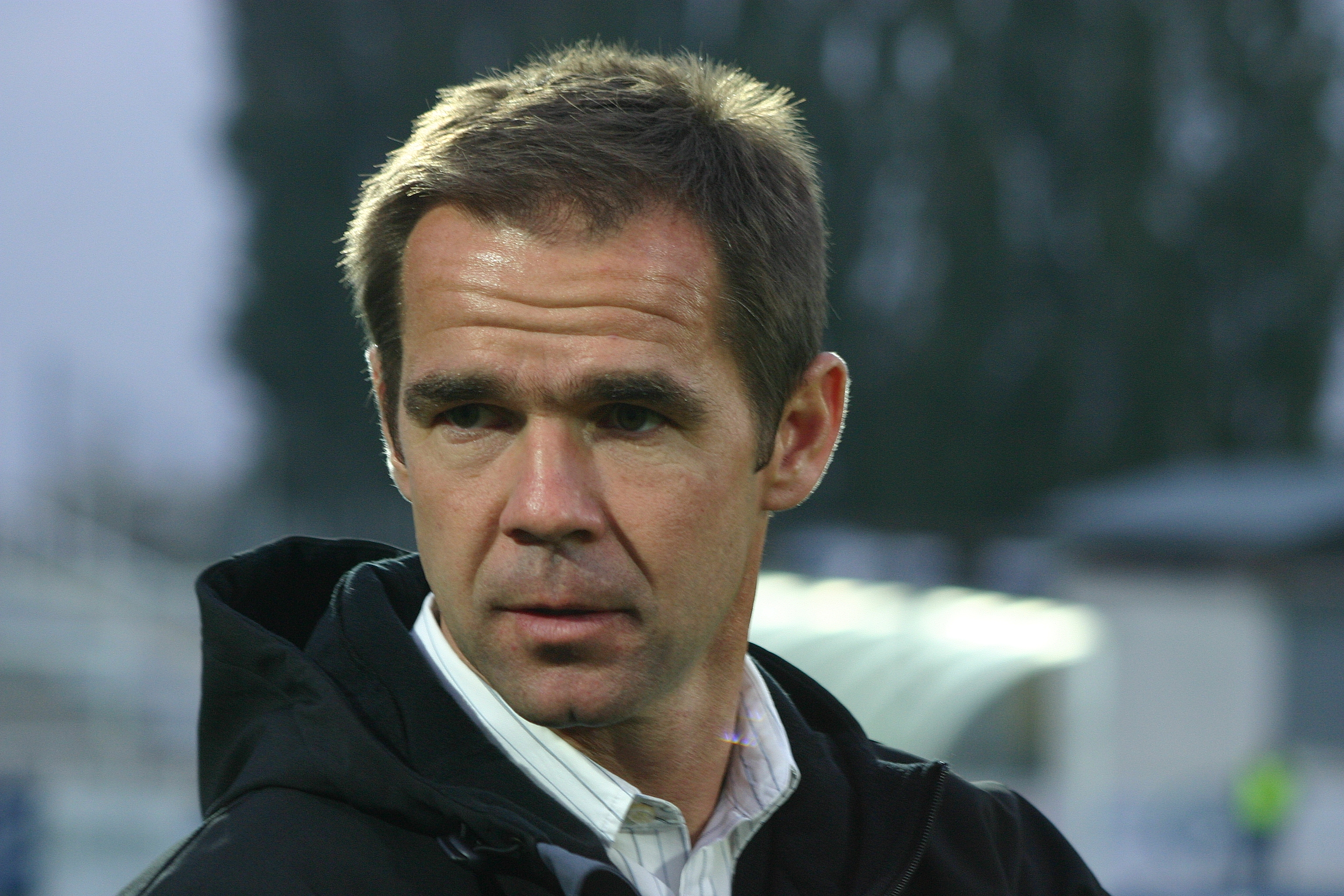
- Kump with DSV Leoben

Personal information
- Date of birth: 1 April 1968 (age 58)
- Place of birth: Graz, Austria
- Position: Midfielder

Senior career*
| Years | Team | Apps | (Gls) |
| 1990–1993 | LUV Graz | | |
| 1993 | Wiener Sport-Club | 1 | (0) |
| 1994–1999 | FC Gratkorn | | |

Managerial career
- ?–2008: Grazer AK (athletic director)
- ?–2008: Grazer AK II
- 2008–2009: DSV Leoben
- * Club domestic league appearances and goals

Heimo Kump (born 1 April 1968) is an Austrian football manager and former player. He previously managed clubs including DSV Leoben.
