= 1980–81 Austrian Cup =

Tournament details
- Country: Austria

Final positions
- Champions: Grazer AK
- Runners-up: Austria Salzburg

The 1980–81 Austrian Cup (German: ÖFB-Cup) was the 47th season of Austria's nationwide football cup competition. The final was played over two legs, on 20 May 1981 at the Stadion Lehen, Salzburg and on 2 June 1981 at the Liebenauer Stadium, Graz.

The competition was won by Grazer AK after beating Austria Salzburg 2–1 on aggregate.

== First round ==
Team 1	Score	Team 2
9 August 1980
ASK Salzburg	0–1	SC Austria Lustenau
ASK Voitsberg	2–2 (a.e.t.) (3–4 p)	SV Spittal/Drau
Admira Dornbirn	1–0	IG Bregenz/Dornbirn
Chemie Linz	1–0	Union Wels
FC Trofaiach	0–3	Austria Klagenfurt
Favoritner AC	0–2	First Vienna FC
SC Gaswerk/Straßenbahn	4–1	Floridsdorfer AC
Landstraßer AC	2–0	Badener AC
Rapid Lienz	0–1	Kapfenberger SV
Rot–Weiß Rankweil	0–2	SPG Amateure Wattens
SC Neunkirchen	1–0	1. Simmeringer SC
SC Schwaz	0–2	SPG Innsbruck
SV Feldkirchen	3–3 (a.e.t.) (3–4 p)	SC Amateure St. Veit
SV Flavia Solva	1–2	SK Vorwärts Steyr
SV Hall	2–6	SSW Innsbruck
SV Heid Stockerau	0–2	ASV Kittsee
SV Oberwart	3–4	1. SC Wiener Neustadt
SV St. Veit	0–1	Villacher SV
SV Traun	0–1	Donawitzer SV Alpine
USK Anif	0–2	Salzburger AK 1914
Union Vöcklamarkt	2–4	Wolfsberger AC

== Second round ==
Team 1	Score	Team 2
15 August 1980
SC Austria Lustenau	1–5	SSW Innsbruck
Kapfenberger SV	1–4	Villacher SV
SPG Innsbruck	4–4 (a.e.t.) (2–4 p)	Admira Dornbirn
First Vienna FC	3–0	SC Neunkirchen
SK Vorwärts Steyr	1–0	Donawitzer SV Alpine
16 August 1980
SC Amateure St. Veit	3–2	Wolfsberger AC
17 August 1980
ASV Kittsee	1–3 (a.e.t.)	Wiener Sport-Club/Post
19 August 1980
1. SC Wiener Neustadt	1–8	SK Rapid Wien
Austria Klagenfurt	3–4 (a.e.t.)	SK Sturm Graz
Chemie Linz	0–4	Grazer AK
FC Waidhofen/Ybbs	0–4	SC Eisenstadt
SC Gaswerk/Straßenbahn	1–2	Admira/Wacker
Landstraßer AC	1–1 (a.e.t.) (3–4 p)	FK Austria Wien
SV Spittal/Drau	1–1 (a.e.t.) (3–5 p)	Linzer ASK
Salzburger AK 1914	1–2	VOEST Linz
SPG Amateure Wattens	1–2	SV Austria Salzburg

== Third round ==
Team 1	Score	Team 2
2 September 1980
Admira/Wacker	3–1	SC Amateure St. Veit
Grazer AK	2–1	FK Austria Wien
Linzer ASK	8–1	Admira Dornbirn
SK Rapid Wien	2–0 (a.e.t.)	VOEST Linz
SC Eisenstadt	0–2	Wiener Sport-Club/Post
SSW Innsbruck	5–0	Villacher SV
SV Austria Salzburg	2–0	SK Vorwärts Steyr
First Vienna FC	0–3	SK Sturm Graz

== Quarter-finals ==
Team 1	Score	Team 2
31 March 1981
SSW Innsbruck	3–2	Admira/Wacker
SV Austria Salzburg	2–1	Linzer ASK
SK Sturm Graz	1–1 (a.e.t.) (3–4 p)	Wiener Sport-Club
7 April 1981
Grazer AK	1–0	SK Rapid Wien

== Semi-finals ==
Team 1	Score	Team 2
5 May 1981
Grazer AK	2–1	SSW Innsbruck
Wiener Sport-Club	3–3 (a.e.t.) (5–6 p)	SV Austria Salzburg

== Final ==
=== First leg ===
20 May 1981
19:00

SV Austria Salzburg	1–0	Grazer AK
Schildt 6'	Report

Stadion Lehen, Salzburg
Attendance: 5,500
Referee: Franz Latzin

=== Second leg ===
2 June 1981
17:15

Grazer AK	2–0 (a.e.t.)	SV Austria Salzburg
Stering 2' (pen.); Riedl 106'	Report

Liebenauer Stadium, Graz
Attendance: 7,100
Referee: Erich Linemayr

Grazer AK won 2–1 on aggregate.
