= Heinz Karner =

Austrian football manager (born 1974)

Personal information
- Date of birth: 24 November 1974 (age 51)

Managerial career
- Years: Team
- 2008–2009: Grazer AK II (assistant)
- 2010: Grazer AK
- 2011–2012: SC Kalsdorf (assistant)
- 2012–2013: DSV Leoben

Heinz Karner (born 24 November 1974) is an Austrian football manager.
