= René Poms =

Austrian football manager and player (born 1975)

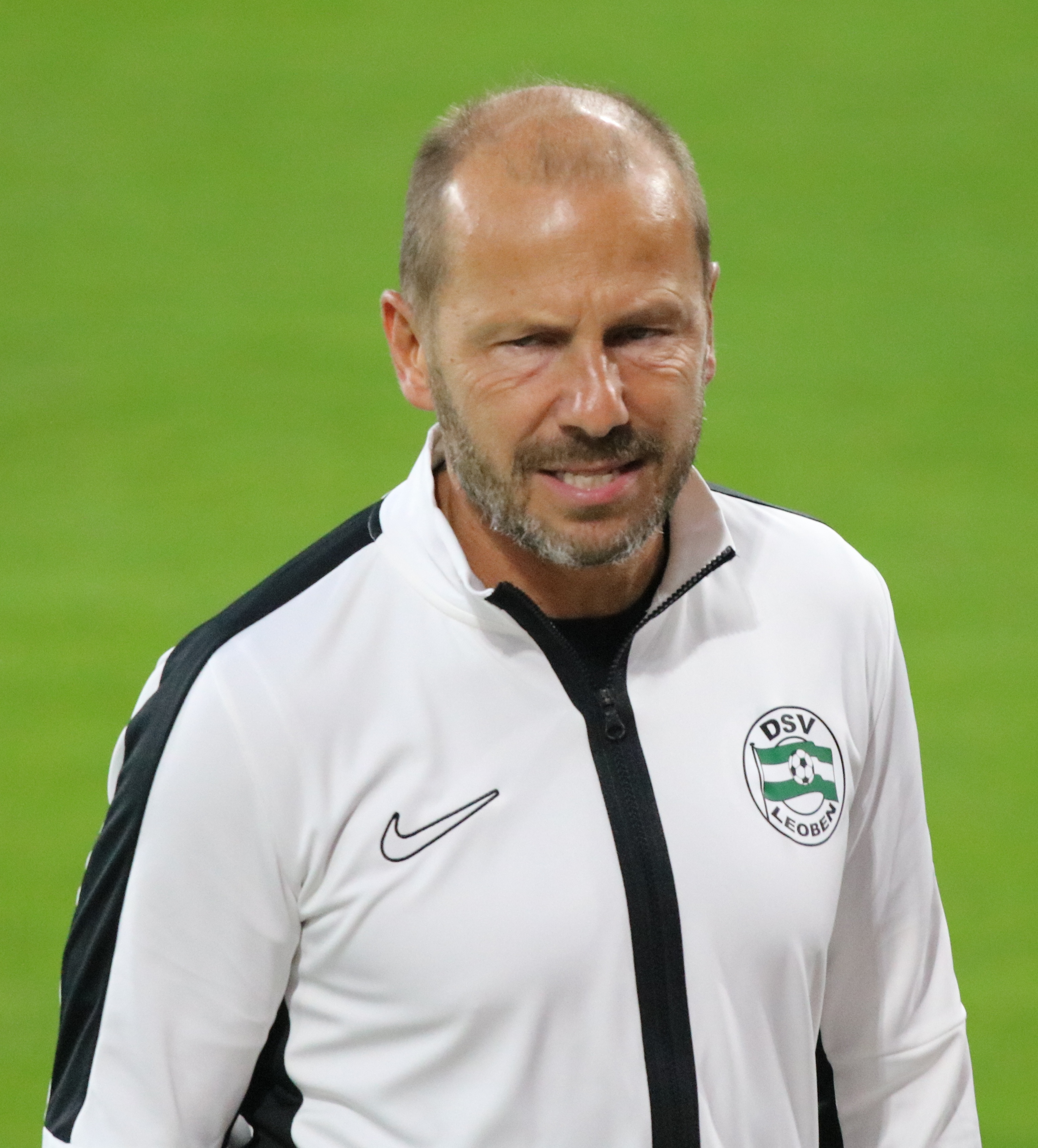
- Poms with DSV Leoben in 2023

Personal information
- Date of birth: 5 July 1975 (age 51)
- Place of birth: Leoben, Austria
- Height: 1.75 m (5 ft 9 in)
- Position: Midfielder

Team information
- Current team: GKS Tychy (manager)

Youth career
- DSV Leoben

Senior career*
Years	Team	Apps	(Gls)
–1994	DSV Leoben II		
1994–1996	DSV Leoben	12	(0)
1995	→ FC Trofaiach (loan)		
1996–2000	FC Trofaiach		
2000–2001	DSV Leoben	30	(0)
2001–2002	Kapfenberger SV	28	(4)
2002–2003	DSV Leoben	7	(0)
2003–2005	SV Rottenmann		
2005–2006	SV Bad Aussee		
2005	→ SC Weiz (loan)	15	(6)
2006–2007	SV Rottenmann	13	(1)
2007–2011	SC Bruck/Mur	40	(5)
2007–2011	SC Bruck/Mur II	12	(5)
2009	→ SV Bad Goisern (loan)		
2011–2012	SV Union Kalwang		
2012	SC Bruck/Mur		
2012–2014	TUS Spielberg	7	(2)

Managerial career
- 2007–2011: SC Bruck/Mur (player-manager)
- 2011: SC Bruck/Mur
- 2012–2013: Wolfsberger AC II
- 2016: SC Bruck/Mur
- 2022–2023: NK Osijek
- 2023–2024: DSV Leoben
- 2024: PAS Giannina
- 2024–2025: Grazer AK
- 2026–: GKS Tychy
- * Club domestic league appearances and goals

René Poms (born 5 July 1975) is an Austrian professional football manager and former player who played as a midfielder. He is currently in charge of Polish II liga club GKS Tychy.

== Playing career ==
Poms started his senior career as a player at DSV Leoben, making his debut in the Austrian second division in 1994. He played primarily in the lower leagues of Styria and Carinthia, gaining experience at clubs such as FC Trofaiach (championship and promotion in 1998–99), Kapfenberger SV (Regionalliga Mitte championship and promotion in 2001–02), and SV Bad Aussee (championship and promotion in 2004–05). He ended his career in 2014 at TUS Spielberg, combining playing and coaching.

== Managerial career ==
He was an assistant to Nenad Bjelica at Wolfsberger AC, Austria Wien, Spezia, Lech Poznań, Dinamo Zagreb and NK Osijek.

On 10 March 2026, he became the new coach of Polish second tier club GKS Tychy, signing a contract until the end of the season. Placed last in the league table at the time of Poms' appointment, GKS' relegation to the II liga was confirmed on 9 May. Despite being unable to save the club from demotion, Poms' contract was extended for another year on 15 May.

== Managerial statistics ==
As of match played 21 November 2026

Managerial record by team and tenure
Team	From	To	Record							
Team	From	To	G	W	D	L	GF	GA	GD	Win %
NK Osijek	29 August 2022	2 March 2023	19	10	3	6	28	16	+12	52.63
DSV Leoben	28 August 2023	5 April 2024	20	11	4	5	33	21	+12	55.00
PAS Giannina	15 July 2024	21 October 2024	8	5	1	2	24	7	+17	62.50
Grazer AK	22 October 2024	21 March 2025	12	3	3	6	15	21	−6	25.00
GKS Tychy	10 March 2026	Present	28	13	9	6	41	32	+9	46.43
Total			87	42	20	25	141	97	+44	48.28

== Honours ==
=== As a player ===
FC Trofaiach

- Oberliga Nord: 1998–99

Kapfenberger SV

- Regionalliga Mitte: 2001–02

SV Bad Aussee

- Landesliga Steiermark: 2004–05

SC Bruck/Mur

- Oberliga Nord: 2007–08

=== As a manager ===
SC Bruck/Mur

- Oberliga Nord: 2007–08, 2015–16

Wolfsberger AC II

- Kärntner Liga: 2012–13
