= 1983–84 Austrian Cup =

Tournament details
- Country: Austria

Final positions
- Champions: Rapid Wien
- Runners-up: Austria Wien

The 1983–84 Austrian Cup (German: ÖFB-Cup) was the 50th season of Austria's nationwide football cup competition. The final was played over two legs, on 8 May 1984 at the Praterstadion, Vienna and on 15 May 1984 at the Gerhard Hanappi Stadium, Vienna.

The competition was won by Rapid Wien after beating Austria Wien on away goals rule after the tie finished 3–3 on aggregate.

== Second round ==
Team 1	Score	Team 2
24 August 1983
Slovan/HAC	1–0	UFC Purbach
30 August 1983
USV Salzburg	2–4	SV Austria Salzburg
SC Mittersill	3–1	FC Zell am See
Dornbirner SV	1–3	Salzburger AK 1914
SK Tamsweg	1–3 (a.e.t.)	ASK Salzburg
SR Donaufeld	0–3	Badener AC
LSV Wien	0–7	Wiener Sport-Club
Union Vöcklamarkt	2–1	SV Spittal
SC Kundl	1–5	SSW Innsbruck
SV Gmunden	1–2	Donawitzer SV Alpine
SV Güssing	1–0	Favoritner AC
SK St. Magdalena	0–5	Austria Klagenfurt
FC Trofaiach	0–1	Linzer ASK
ASK Voitsberg	3–1	Kapfenberger SV
SV Feldkirchen	0–2	VOEST Linz
SK Altheim	2–1	FC Flavia Solva
Deutschlandsberger SC	3–2	SV St. Veit
Phönix Mürzzuschlag	0–2	Grazer AK
ASK-BSC Bruck/Leitha	0–16	FK Austria Wien
Rapid Lienz	0–1 (a.e.t.)	SK Sturm Graz
1. SC Wiener Neustadt	1–2 (a.e.t.)	Admira/Wacker
VfB Union Mödling	1–1 (a.e.t.) (3–2 p)	SK Vorwärts Steyr
SC Kufstein	0–2	WSG Wattens
FC Waidhofen/Ybbs	1–7	SC Eisenstadt
SV Schwechat	3–1	SC Neusiedl am See
SG Red Star/Auto	0–10	SK Rapid Wien
SV Heid Stockerau	0–0 (a.e.t.) (7–6 p)	First Vienna FC
TSV Hartberg	1–2	Union Wels
SV Feldbach	3–3 (a.e.t.) (5–6 p)	Villacher SV
31 August 1983
USV Rudersdorf	2–1	1. Simmeringer SC
ASKÖ Irschen	1–0	Wolfsberger AC
VfB Hohenems	1–3	IG Bregenz/Dornbirn

== Third round ==
Team 1	Score	Team 2
25 October 1983
Austria Klagenfurt	3–0	Linzer ASK
SK Rapid Wien	4–1	Admira/Wacker
26 October 1983
SC Mittersill	1–0 (a.e.t.)	SV Austria Salzburg
Salzburger AK 1914	2–1	Villacher SV
ASK Salzburg	1–0	WSG Wattens
Wiener Sport-Club	2–0 (a.e.t.)	VfB Union Mödling
Donawitzer SV Alpine	2–3	SK Sturm Graz
ASKÖ Irschen	1–6	Grazer AK
Slovan/HAC	1–0	SC Eisenstadt
Union Vöcklamarkt	1–0	SK Altheim
Badener AC	3–2	SV Heid Stockerau
SV Schwechat	0–1	USV Rudersdorf
VOEST Linz	0–2	Union Wels
FK Austria Wien	4–0	SV Güssing
SSW Innsbruck	6–2 (a.e.t.)	IG Bregenz/Dornbirn
Deutschlandsberger SC	2–1 (a.e.t.)	ASK Voitsberg

== Fourth round ==
Team 1	Score	Team 2
2 March 1984
Grazer AK	0–1	SK Rapid Wien
3 March 1984
ASK Salzburg	0–8	FK Austria Wien
Badener AC	2–1 (a.e.t.)	Wiener Sport-Club
SK Sturm Graz	1–0 (a.e.t.)	Austria Klagenfurt
SC Mittersill	0–2	Slovan/HAC
Deutschlandsberger SC	1–0	USV Rudersdorf
13 March 1984
Salzburger AK 1914	0–2	SSW Innsbruck
Union Vöcklamarkt	w/o	Union Wels

== Quarter-finals ==
Team 1	Score	Team 2
13 March 1984
Union Vöcklamarkt	0–2	SK Rapid Wien
SK Sturm Graz	2–0	Badener AC
14 March 1984
Slovan/HAC	0–5	FK Austria Wien
20 March 1984
SSW Innsbruck	9–0	Deutschlandsberger SC

== Semi-finals ==
The first leg matches were played on 3 and 11 April, while the second leg matches were played on 24 April 1984.

Team 1	Agg.	Team 2	1st leg	2nd leg
SK Rapid Wien	2–1	SSW Innsbruck	2–0	0–1
SK Sturm Graz	2–4	FK Austria Wien	2–0	0–4

== Final ==
=== First leg ===
8 May 1984
19:30

FK Austria Wien	3–1	SK Rapid Wien
Polster 57', 75'; Nyilasi 70'	Report	Kranjčar 77'

Praterstadion, Vienna
Attendance: 11,000
Referee: Franz Wöhrer

=== Second leg ===
15 May 1984
19:30

SK Rapid Wien	2–0	FK Austria Wien
Weinhofer 13'; Kienast 24'	Report

Gerhard Hanappi Stadium, Vienna
Attendance: 20,000
Referee: Heinz Fahnler

3–3 on aggregate. SK Rapid Wien won on away goals.
