= Okan Aydın =

Turkish footballer

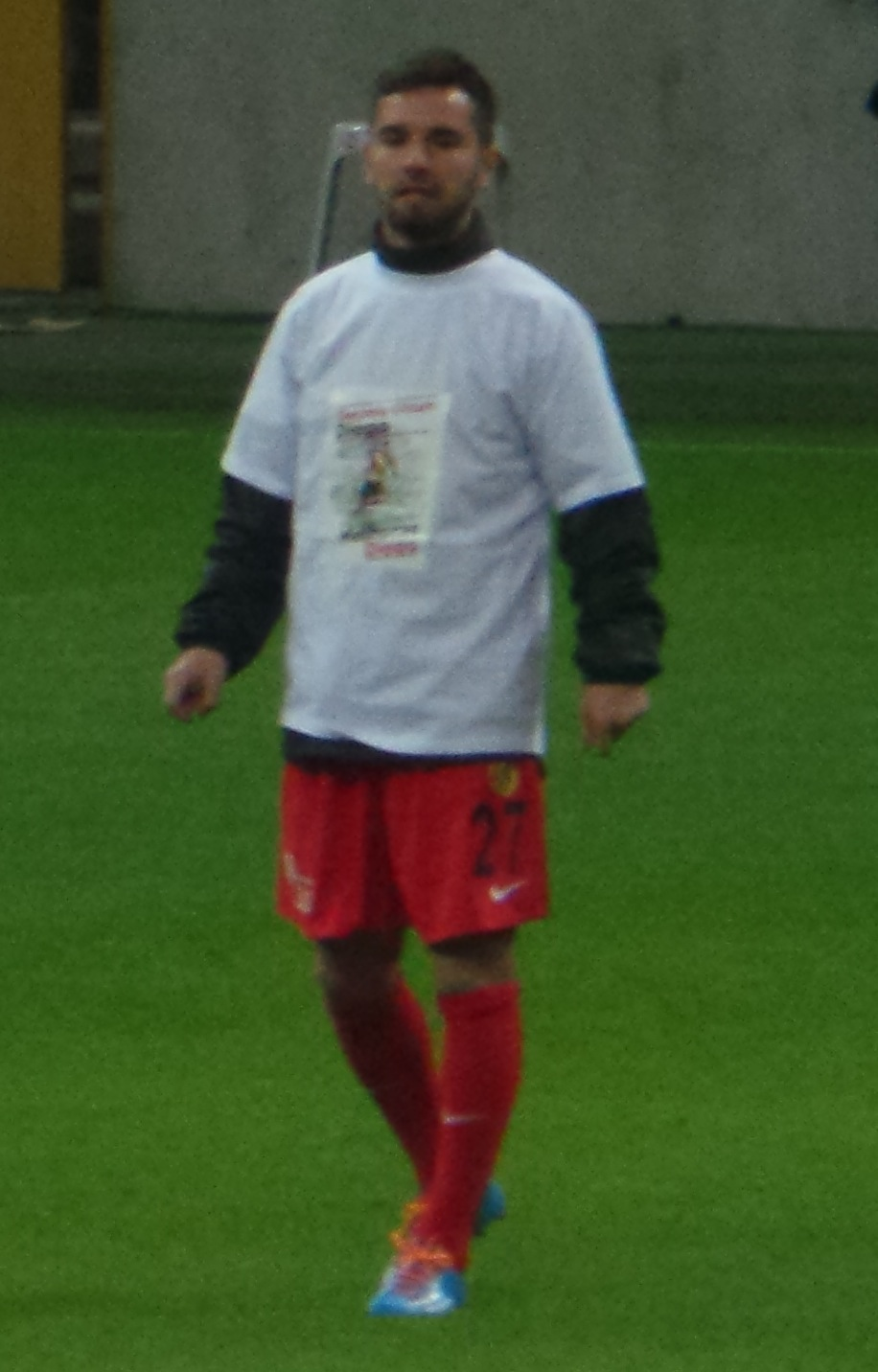
- Aydın warming up for Eskişehirspor in 2014

Personal information
- Date of birth: 8 May 1994 (age 32)
- Place of birth: Leverkusen, Germany
- Height: 1.71 m (5 ft 7 in)
- Position: Forward

Team information
- Current team: ASKÖ Oedt
- Number: 18

Youth career
- –2002: SV 07 Setterich
- 2002–2012: Bayer Leverkusen

Senior career*
Years	Team	Apps	(Gls)
2012–2013	Bayer Leverkusen II	28	(5)
2012–2013	Bayer Leverkusen	1	(0)
2013–2014	Eskişehirspor	1	(0)
2014–2017	Rot-Weiß Erfurt	98	(12)
2017–2018	Chemnitzer FC	19	(0)
2019–2020	Viktoria Berlin	0	(0)
2019	→ Austria Klagenfurt (loan)	15	(4)
2019–2020	Austria Klagenfurt	29	(12)
2021–2022	Wacker Innsbruck	31	(6)
2022–2023	TSV Hartberg	26	(5)
2023	Debrecen	1	(0)
2024	Schwarz-Weiß Bregenz	11	(1)
2024–2025	DSV Leoben	26	(11)
2025	Dornbirn	11	(1)
2026–	ASKÖ Oedt	13	(8)

International career
2009–2010	Germany U16	5	(2)
2010–2011	Germany U17	21	(5)
2012	Germany U18	1	(0)
2013	Turkey U19	11	(2)
2013	Turkey U20	3	(0)
Medal record
Turkey U19
Runner-up	Mediterranean Games	2013
FIFA U-17 World Cup
Bronze medal – third place	2011
- * Club domestic league appearances and goals as of 27 June 2026

Okan Aydın (Turkish pronunciation: [oˈkan ajˈdɯn], born 8 May 1994) is a professional footballer who plays as a forward for Austrian club ASKÖ Oedt. Born in Germany, he is a former youth international for Turkey.

== Club career ==
Aydın went through Bayer 04 Leverkusen's youth ranks and eventually made his Bundesliga debut in October 2012 in a 2–2 draw with Mainz 05, as a substitute for Simon Rolfes. On 6 September 2013, he joined Eskişehirspor on a three-year contract. After not being able to establish himself at the Turkish club and earning only a single cap during the 2013–14 season, he moved back to Germany and joined 3. Liga side Rot-Weiß Erfurt. There he signed a one-year contract including a two-year extension clause.

In September 2020, Okan moved to China League One side Jiangxi Liansheng F.C. from Austria Klagenfurt.

On 14 January 2022, Okan signed a 1.5-year contract with TSV Hartberg in the Austrian Football Bundesliga.

On 14 February 2023, Okan joined Debrecen in Hungary.

On 4 February 2024, he returned to Austria and signed with Schwarz-Weiß Bregenz.

== International career ==
Aydın played for the Turkey national under-19 football team, which won the silver medal at the 2013 Mediterranean Games in Mersin, Turkey. He also represented Turkey at the 2013 UEFA European Under-19 Championship. Aydin also represented Germany at the 2011 U17 World Cup where he helped Germany obtain third place after losing a dramatic overtime game in the semifinals to the eventual champions and hosts Mexico.

== Personal life ==
Aydın's younger brother, Anıl Aydın, is also a professional footballer.
