= Gerd Springer =

Austrian sportsperson (1927–1999)

Personal information
- Date of birth: 6 February 1927
- Place of birth: Innsbruck, Austria
- Date of death: 28 July 1999 (aged 72)
- Place of death: Klagenfurt, Austria

Managerial career
- Years: Team
- 1964–1967: Austria Klagenfurt
- 1967–1970: Sturm Graz
- 1970–1972: Rapid Wien
- 1972–1973: Alpine Donawitz
- 1974–1975: Austria Klagenfurt
- 1975–1976: Wolfsberger AC
- 1976–1977: Alpine Donawitz
- 1977–1978: Grazer AK
- 1979: FavAC
- 1979–1980: Villacher SV
- 1980–1981: 1. Wiener Neustädter SC
- 1990: Austria Klagenfurt

Gerhard "Gerdi" Springer (6 February 1927 – 28 July 1999) was an Austrian football player and coach. He was also an ice hockey player (bronze medalist with the Austrian team at the World Championships 1947; member of the Austrian team in the men's tournament at the 1956 Winter Olympics.) and coach.

He coached, inter alia, Sturm Graz, Rapid Wien, Austria Klagenfurt, Grazer AK, 1. Wiener Neustädter SC, Alpine Donawitz.
