= Savo Ekmečić =

Bosnian footballer and manager

Personal information
- Date of birth: 9 May 1948 (age 78)
- Place of birth: Mostar
- Position: Goalkeeper

Senior career*
Years	Team	Apps	(Gls)
1974–1977	FK Sarajevo		
1977–1986	Grazer AK		

Managerial career
- 1988: Grazer AK
- 1990–1992: Grazer AK
- 1996–1997: DSV Leoben
- * Club domestic league appearances and goals

Savo Ekmečić (born 9 May 1948) is a retired Bosnian football goalkeeper.

== Playing career ==
He played a large part of his career for Grazer AK, where he was voted the club's Player of the Century in 2002.
