= Bernhard Muhr =

Austrian footballer and manager

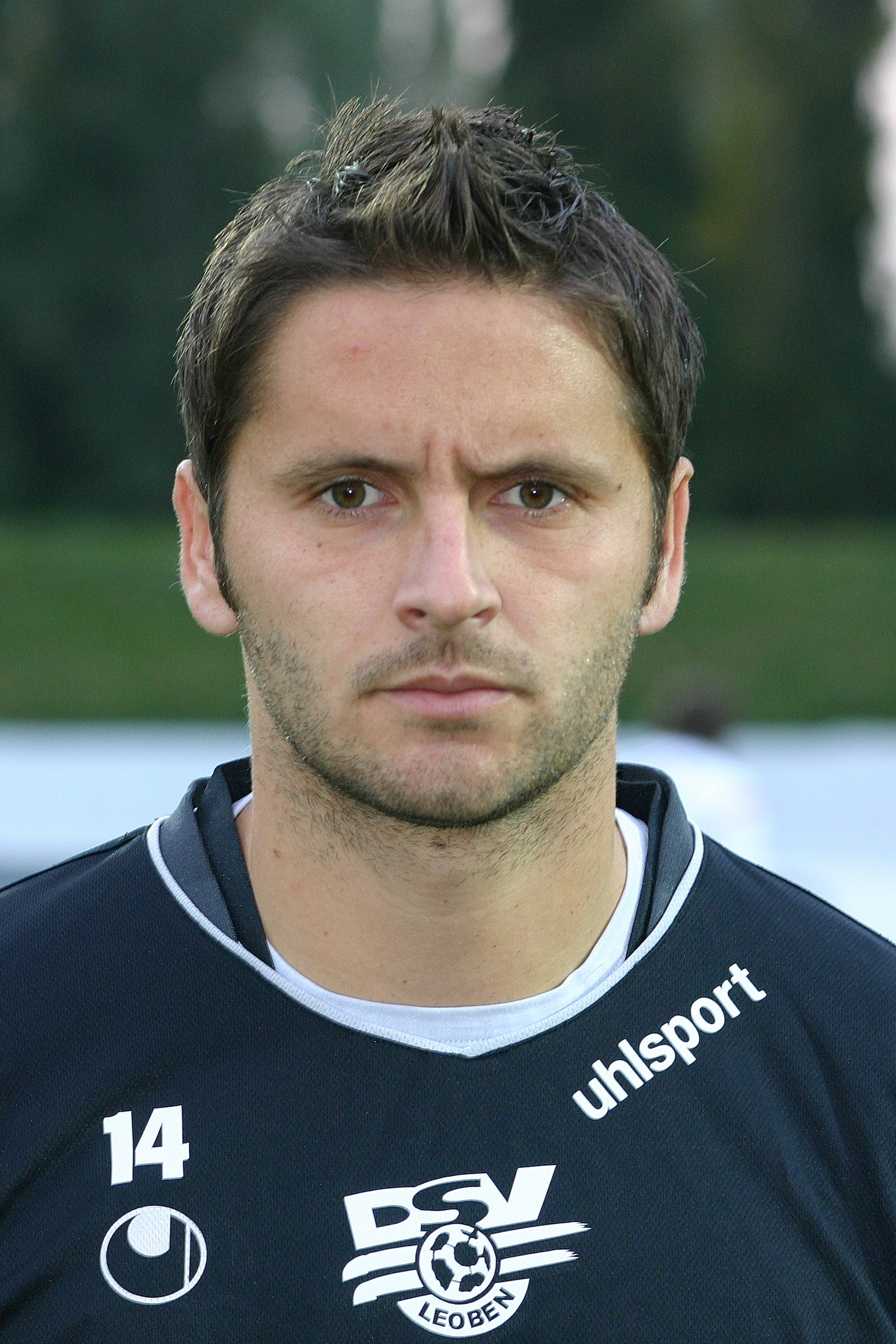

Personal information
- Date of birth: 17 March 1977 (age 49)
- Place of birth: Graz, Austria
- Height: 1.80 m (5 ft 11 in)
- Position: Defender

Youth career
- 1987–1994: FC Gratkorn

Senior career*
Years	Team	Apps	(Gls)
1994–1998	FC Gratkorn		
1998–2002	LASK Linz	77	(1)
2002–2004	FC Untersiebenbrunn	43	(1)
2004–2007	SC Rheindorf Altach	65	(1)
2007–2009	DSV Leoben	52	(2)
2009–2010	FK Austria Wien II	25	(0)
2010–2012	DSV Leoben	22	(0)
2012–2013	SV Peggau		

International career
1998–1999	Austria U21	12	(0)

Managerial career
- 2010–2011: DSV II
- 2012: DSV Leoben
- 2012–2016: SV Peggau
- * Club domestic league appearances and goals

Bernhard Muhr (born 17 March 1977) is an Austrian football manager and former footballer who played as a defender.

He was last manager of SV Peggau.
