= Heinz Thonhofer =

Austrian footballer

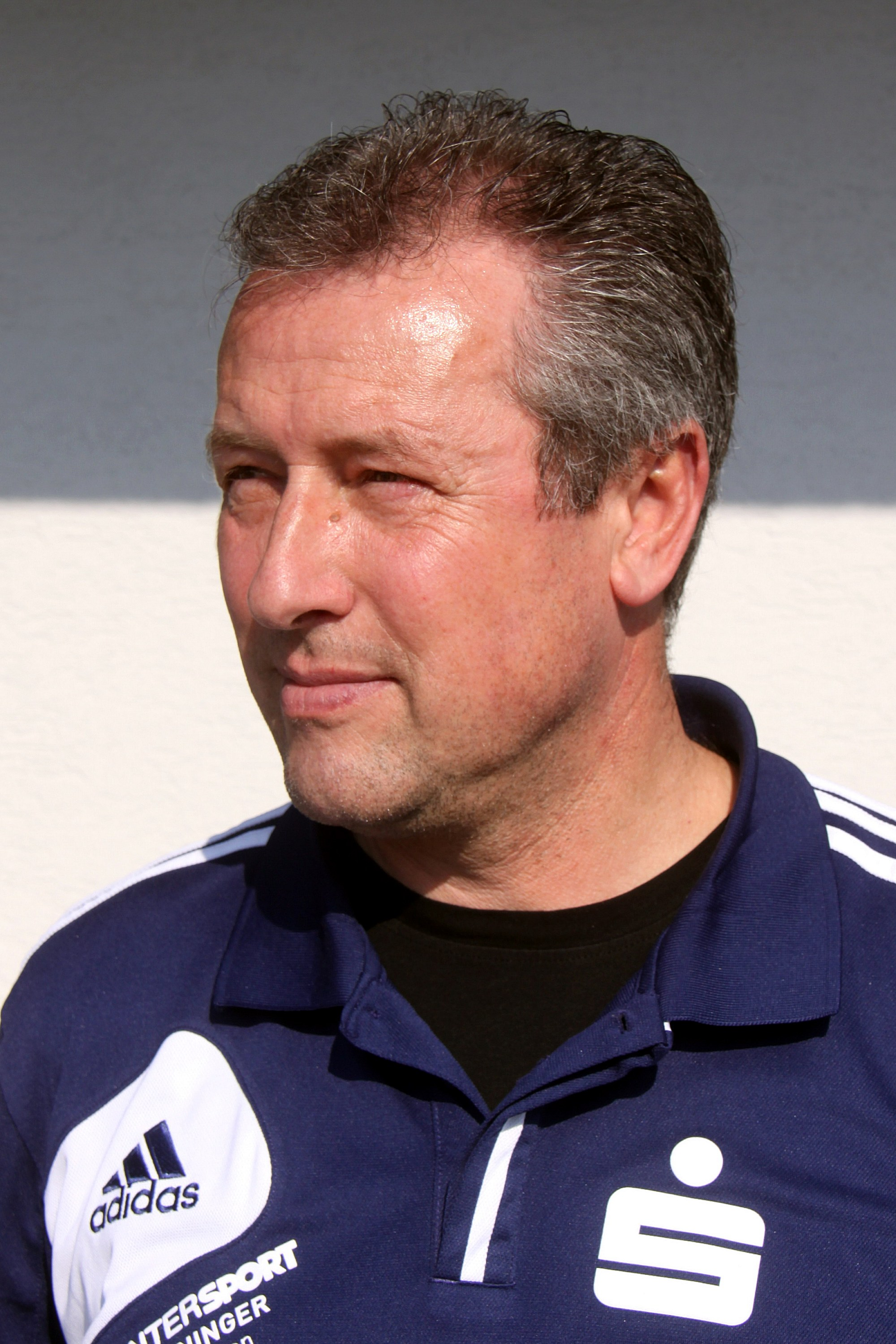
- Heinz Thonhofer in 2014

Personal information
- Date of birth: 25 September 1959 (age 67)
- Place of birth: Bruck an der Mur, Austria
- Position: Midfielder

Senior career*
| Years | Team | Apps | (Gls) |
| 1981–1982 | Alpine Donawitz | | |
| 1983–1993 | Sturm Graz | 235 | (24) |
| 1993–1997 | Kapfenberger SV | | |

International career
| 1983 | Austria | 1 | (0) |

Managerial career
- 2003-2005: DSV Leoben
- 2006-2008: SV Bad Aussee
- 2008-2009: SV Waidhofen/Thaya
- 2009-2012: SV Flavia Solva
- 2012-2017: SKU Amstetten
- 2017-2019: SV Frohnleiten
- 2019-2023: SV Tobelbad
- 2023-: SV Gralla
- * Club domestic league appearances and goals

Heinz Thonhofer (born 25 September 1959) is an Austrian footballer. He played in one match for the Austria national football team in 1983.
