= Gregor Pötscher =

Austrian footballer

Personal information
- Date of birth: 26 March 1973 (age 53)
- Place of birth: Graz, Austria
- Height: 1.75 m (5 ft 9 in)
- Position: Defender

Senior career*
Years	Team	Apps	(Gls)
1989–2006	Grazer AK	241	(2)

Managerial career
- 2008: Grazer AK (assistant)
- 2008–2010: Grazer AK
- 2010: ASK Köflach
- 2011–2012: DSV Leoben
- 2013–2015: DSV Leoben
- 2015–2016: SC Weiz
- * Club domestic league appearances and goals

Gregor Pötscher (born 26 March 1973) is an Austrian football coach and former player. He played as a defender.
