= Karl Durspekt =

Austrian footballer

Personal information
- Full name: Karl Franz Durspekt
- Date of birth: 23 November 1913
- Place of birth: Vienna, Austria-Hungary
- Date of death: 14 February 1978 (aged 64)
- Place of death: Vienna, Austria

Youth career
- SC Nord-Wien 1912

Senior career*
Years	Team	Apps	(Gls)
1932–1935	Admira Wien		
1935–1938	FC Rouen		
1938–1939	Admira Wien		
1939–1942	Floridsdorfer AC		
1942–1945	LSV Markersdorf an der Pielach		
1945–1948	Floridsdorfer AC		
1948–?	SC Nord-Wien 1912		

International career
1935	Austria	2	(1)

Managerial career
- 1948: Floridsdorfer AC
- 1950: SV Wimpassing
- 1950–1952: Lunds BK
- 1953–1954: FC Locarno
- 1956–1957: Åtvidabergs FF
- 1960–1961: SSV Jahn Regensburg
- 1961–1963: PAOK
- 1964–1965: Grazer AK
- 1966–1967: SV Rapid Lienz
- 1970: IK Start (Kristiansand)
- 1970–1971: Grazer AK
- 1975: Bodens BK
- * Club domestic league appearances and goals

Karl Franz Durspekt (23 November 1913 in Vienna, Austria – 14 February 1978 in Vienna, Austria) was an Austrian football player and manager.

As the son of an engine driver, Durspekt worked as a type setter at first. Later he became a professional football player. When he was a young man, he lived about five years in Rouen (France). He spoke fluently in a French and in a Swedish manner. Further, Sweden became his second home. At the beginning of his career, he played for Admira Wien. During this time he won repeatedly the Austrian championship and the Austrian cup.

Durspekt participated in the Mitropa Cup 1934, losing the final to Bologna FC (3:2, 1:5). After the Anschluss that united Germany and Austria in 1938 Admira played for several seasons in the Gauliga Ostmark, one of the top flight regional leagues created through the reorganization of German football under the Third Reich. Durspekt contested with his club Germany's national final in 1939, losing 0:9 to Schalke 04.

After his time at Admira, he played for Florisdorfer Athletic Club (FAC). During the Second World War, he joined LSV Markersdorf an der Pielach. The club was regarded as a centre d'accueil for draftee soccer players. There are also other well-known German and Austrian soccer players like Max Merkel or Karl Sesta.

After the War he returned to FAC and ended his career as a football player. He played two international matches for Austria in 1935 (0:0 vers. Czechoslovakia, 3:6 vers. Hungary). After he ended his career, he went on to become a coach. He trained teams in Egypt, Greece, Sweden, Norway and in Switzerland among others. The Lunds BK, FC Locarno (1953–54), Åtvidabergs FF (1956–1957), Grazer AK, IK Start Kristiansand (1970) were some of his stations as football coach.

He died at the age of 64 in 1978.
