= Heinz Binder =

Austrian footballer (1943–2024)

Personal information
- Date of birth: 29 January 1943
- Date of death: 28 April 2024 (aged 81)
- Place of death: Innsbruck, Austria
- Position: Defender

Youth career
- 1954–1958: SV Donau
- 1958–: SC Elektra

Senior career*
Years	Team	Apps	(Gls)
–1963	SC Elektra		
1963–1967	Austria Wien	74	(0)
1967–1972	Wacker Innsbruck		
1972–1975	DSV Leoben		
1975–1977	GAK		

International career
1964–1966	Austria	9	(0)

Managerial career
- 1983–1984: SSW Wacker Innsbruck
- 1985–1986: DSV Leoben
- 1990: GAK
- 2001: SSW Wacker Innsbruck
- * Club domestic league appearances and goals

Heinz Binder (29 January 1943 – 28 April 2024) was an Austrian footballer who played as a defender. Binder died in Innsbruck on 28 April 2024, at the age of 81.
