= Anıl Aydın =

German-Turkish footballer

Personal information
- Date of birth: 10 January 2000 (age 26)
- Place of birth: Aachen, Germany
- Height: 1.72 m (5 ft 8 in)
- Position: Attacking midfielder

Team information
- Current team: ASKÖ Oedt
- Number: 29

Youth career
- –2006: VfL Leverkusen
- 2006–20??: Bayer Leverkusen
- 20??–2016: Viktoria Köln
- 2016–2019: 1. FC Köln

Senior career*
Years	Team	Apps	(Gls)
2019–2021	1. FC Kaiserslautern II	14	(6)
2020–2021	1. FC Kaiserslautern	2	(0)
2022	SSVg Velbert	13	(4)
2023–2024	Fortuna Köln II	22	(5)
2024–2025	DSV Leoben	21	(4)
2026–	ASKÖ Oedt	2	(0)
- * Club domestic league appearances and goals as of 27 June 2026

Anıl Aydın (born 10 January 2000) is a German-Turkish professional footballer who plays as an attacking midfielder for Austrian Football Second League squad ASKÖ Oedt.

== Career ==
Aydın played for the youth teams of VfL Leverkusen, Bayer Leverkusen, Viktoria Köln and 1. FC Köln, before joining 1. FC Kaiserslautern in 2019, beginning with the second team. He made his professional debut for Kaiserslautern's senior team in the 3. Liga on 9 January 2021, starting in the home match against former club Viktoria Köln. He was substituted out in the 65th minute for Hendrick Zuck, with the match finishing as a 0–0 draw.

== Personal life ==
Aydın's older brother, Okan Aydın, is also a professional footballer.
