= Thomas Maier (footballer) =

Austrian footballer (born 1998)

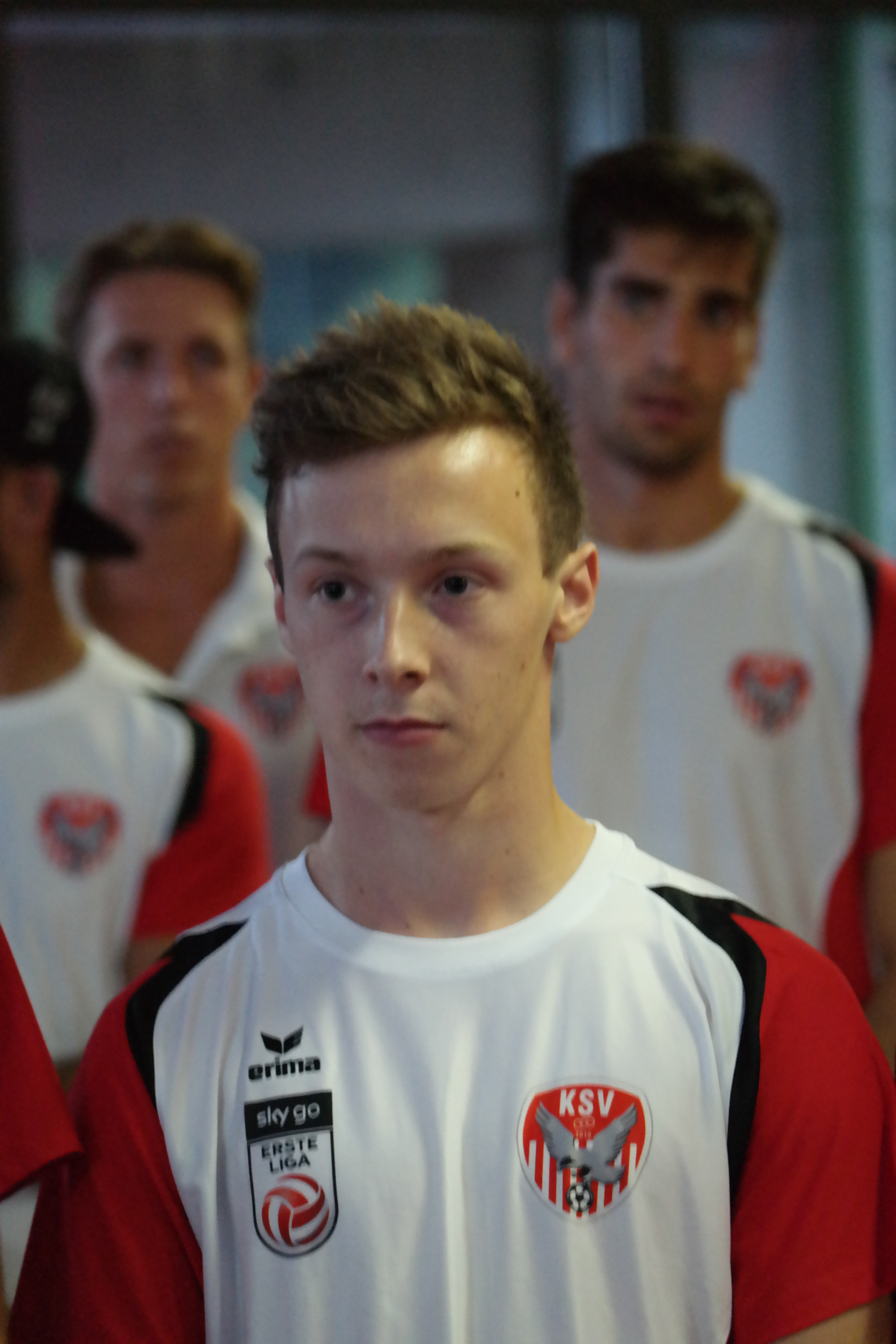
- Maier in 2017

Personal information
- Date of birth: 18 April 1998 (age 28)
- Place of birth: Bruck an der Mur, Austria
- Height: 1.83 m (6 ft 0 in)
- Positions: Attacking midfielder; winger

Team information
- Current team: DSV Leoben
- Number: 71

Youth career
- 2005–2006: SVA Kindberg
- 2006–2014: Kapfenberger SV

Senior career*
Years	Team	Apps	(Gls)
2013–2018	Kapfenberger II	66	(14)
2015–2019	Kapfenberger SV	44	(2)
2019–2021	Wiener Viktoria	22	(3)
2021–2023	DSV Leoben	51	(11)
2024	SV Tillmitsch	7	(2)
2024–	DSV Leoben	15	(6)
- * Club domestic league appearances and goals as of 28 December 2024

Thomas Maier (born 18 April 1998) is an Austrian footballer currently playing for DSV Leoben.
