= SC Neusiedl am See 1919 =

- Full name: Sportclub Neusiedl am See 1919
- Founded: 13 April 1919; 107 years ago
- Ground: Sportzentrum Neusiedl
- Capacity: 3,000
- Head coach: Stefan Rapp
- League: Regionalliga East
- 2023–24: Regionalliga East, 12th of 16

Sportclub Neusiedl am See 1919, commonly known as simply SC Neusiedl/See or NSC 1919, is an Austrian football club based in Neusiedl am See, Burgenland, that competes in the Austrian Regionalliga East, one of the third tiers of Austrian Football. Their home ground is the 3,000-capacity Sportzentrum Neusiedl.

They were relegated from the country's top tier after finishing last in the 1983–84 Austrian Football Bundesliga.

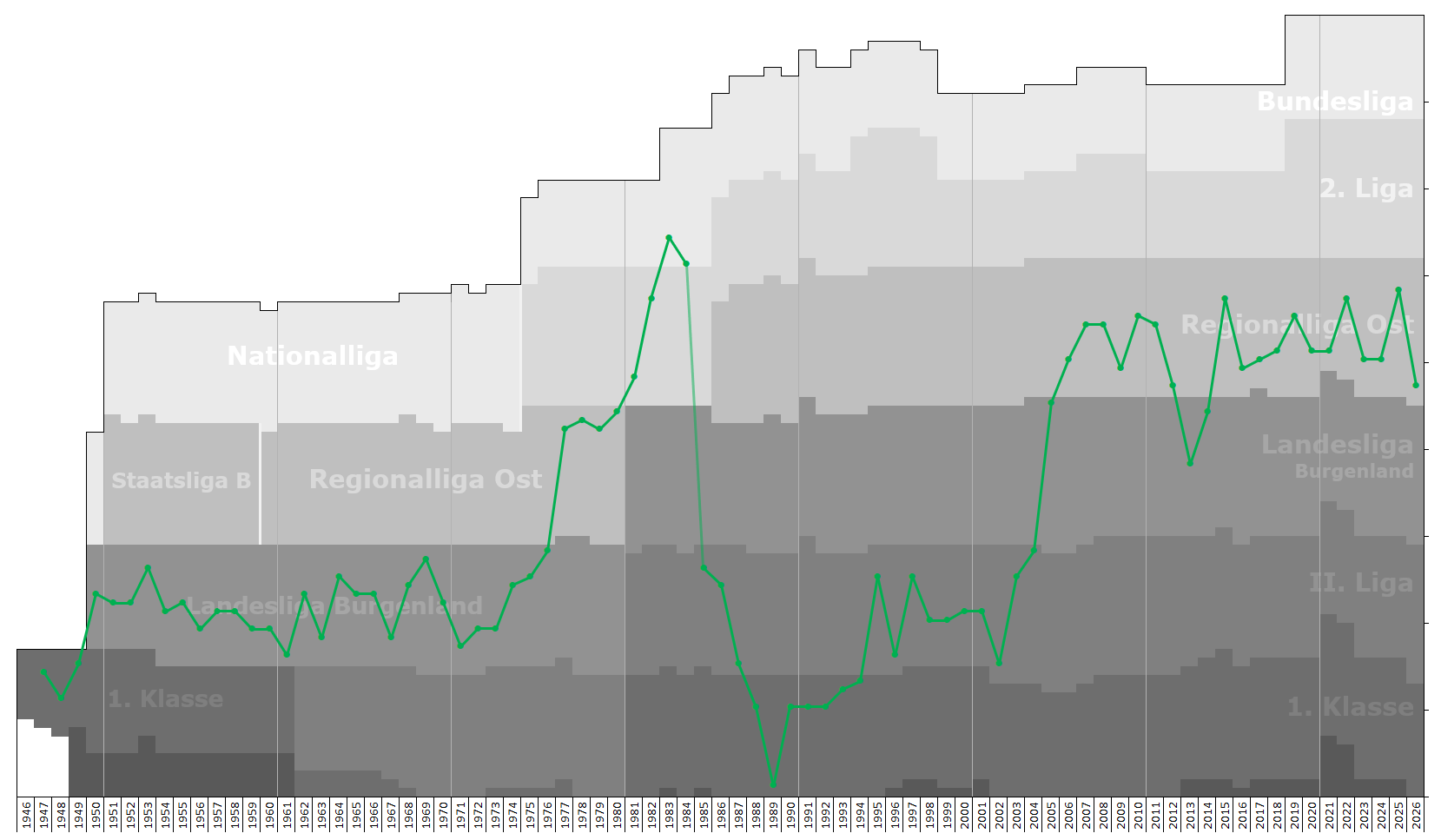
Historical chart of the club's league performance

== Current squad ==
As of 1 March 2026

Note: Flags indicate national team as defined under FIFA eligibility rules; some limited exceptions apply. Players may hold more than one non-FIFA nationality.

No.	Pos.	Nation	Player
1	GK	AUT	Mathias Gindl
2	FW	SVK	Lucas Demitra
4	DF	CRO	Denis Buzuk
5	DF	CMR	Phoenix Missi
7	MF	AUT	Denis Dizdarević
8	MF	AUT	Lukas Umprecht
9	FW	HUN	Erik Burai
10	MF	SVK	Marek Rigo
11	FW	AUT	Houssem Fattoum
12	MF	AUT	Baran Yildiz

No.	Pos.	Nation	Player
13	MF	AUT	Paul Strommer
14	DF	SVK	Tomas Bockay
15	FW	AUT	Elias Tarzi
16	MF	TUR	Berkant Çekiç
17	DF	AUT	Maximilian Wodicka
18	DF	AUT	Andre-Eric Tatzer
19	MF	AUT	Gabriel Federer
20	FW	AUT	Raphael Federer
29	23	AUT	Alexander Mödlhammer

== Coaching staff ==
Position	Name
Manager	Manfred Wachter
Assistant manager	Georg Haider
Goalkeeper coach	Andreas Markl
Business manager	Lukas Stranz
Masseur	Bela Hajszan
