= Union Stadium =

Municipal multi-sports facility in South Africa

- Interactive map of Union Stadium
- Location: Westbury, Johannesburg
- Coordinates: 26.179°S 27.971°E
- Owner: City of Johannesburg
- Operator: City of Johannesburg

Union Stadium is a municipal multi-sports facility situated in Westbury, Johannesburg, South Africa. It is mostly used for football matches.
