= Franz Wohlfahrt (footballer) =

Austrian footballer

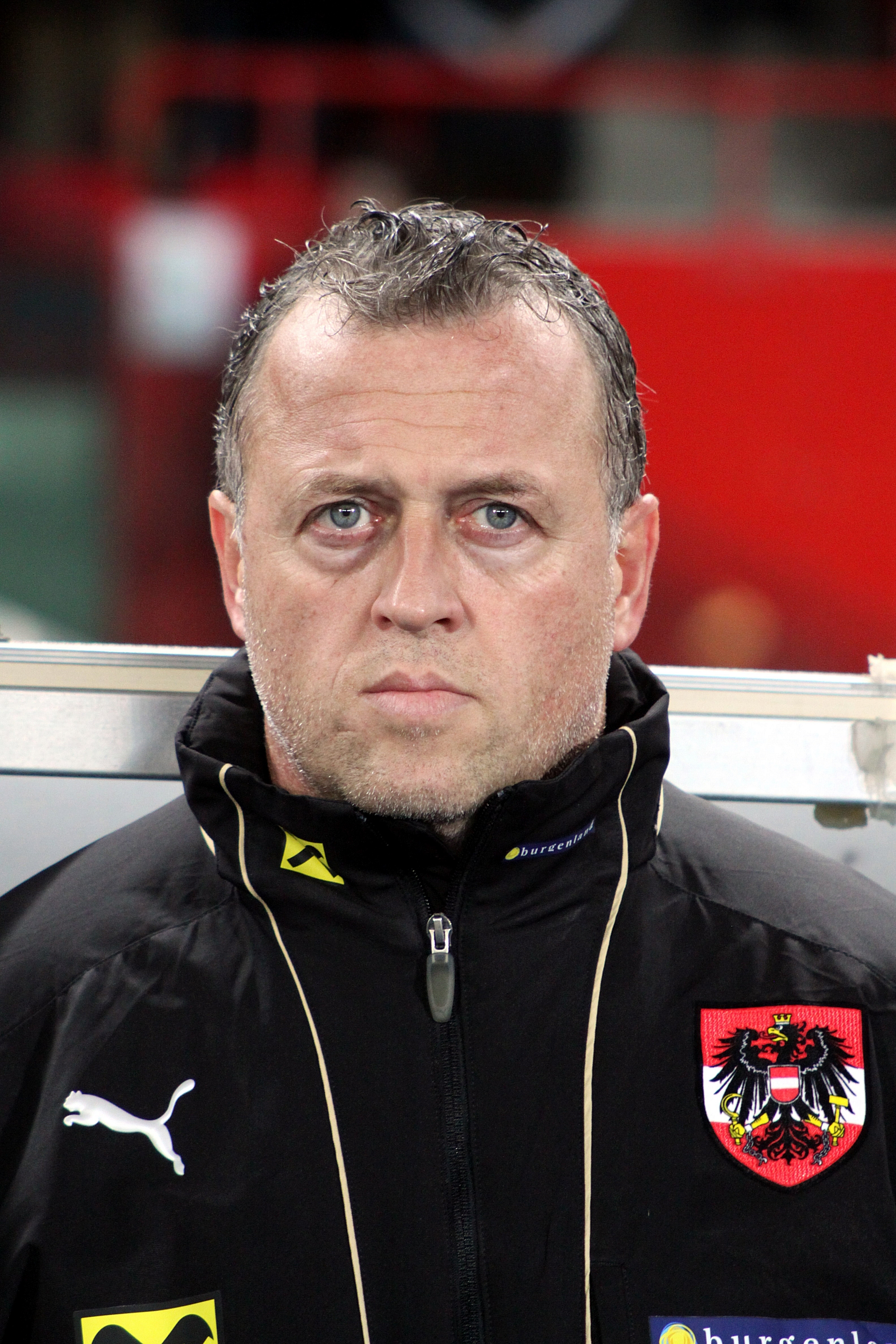
- Wohlfahrt as goalkeeper coach of Austria

Personal information
- Full name: Franz Bernhard Wohlfahrt
- Date of birth: 1 July 1964 (age 62)
- Place of birth: Sankt Veit an der Glan, Austria
- Height: 1.91 m (6 ft 3 in)
- Position: Goalkeeper

Youth career
- 1972–1981: SV Sankt Veit

Senior career*
Years	Team	Apps	(Gls)
1981–1996	Austria Wien	351	(0)
1996–2000	VfB Stuttgart	118	(0)
2000–2002	Austria Wien	33	(0)
Total		502	(0)

International career
1987–2001	Austria	59	(0)

Managerial career
- 2008–: ASV Baden
- * Club domestic league appearances and goals

Franz Bernhard Wohlfahrt (German pronunciation: [ˈfʁants ˈbɛʁnhaʁt ˈvoːlfaːɐ̯t]; born 1 July 1964) is an Austrian former professional footballer who played as a goalkeeper.

== Club career ==
Born in Sankt Veit an der Glan, Carinthia, Wohlfahrt started his career at hometown outfit SV Sankt Veit. He turned professional at FK Austria Wien, where he would spend almost 20 years in two spells, winning six league titles and four domestic cups.

In 1996, aged 32, he finally moved abroad, joining Germany's VfB Stuttgart, and being essential as the club reached the final of the 1997–98 Cup Winner's Cup, lost 1–0 to Chelsea FC. Subsequently, he returned to his first club, retiring a few years later with amateurs SC Untersiebenbrunn.

=== Incident at Ajax–Austria Wien ===
On 27 September 1989, Wohlfahrt made the sports headlines when he was hit and injured by a bar, thrown by a home supporter at an Ajax–Austria Wien UEFA Cup match. Ajax subsequently was banned from European competition for a year.

== International career ==
In 1983, Wohlfahrt was selected by Austria U-20's to play at the 1983 FIFA World Youth Championship. He made his debut for the senior side in an August 1987 friendly match against Switzerland, and was a participant at the 1998 FIFA World Cup, where he was a reserve behind Michael Konsel.

In total, Wohlfahrt earned 59 caps, his final international being in November 2001, a 2002 World Cup qualification match against Turkey, which Austria lost 5–0. He also has the unfortunate distinction of having netted nine goals in a single match, a 9–0 loss to Spain at Valencia's Mestalla Stadium on 27 March 1999.

== Coaching and managerial career ==
In July 2006, Wohlfahrt began a coaching career, training goalkeepers at SK Schwadorf 1936, VfB Admira Wacker Mödling, and the national team. In 2008, he had his first head coach experience, with ASV Baden.

He has been goalkeeping coach for Austria national team. On 9 January 2015, it was announced that Wohlfahrt would become the next Sporting Director of Austria Wien.

== Honours ==
Austria Wien

- Austrian League: 1983–84, 1984–85, 1985–86, 1990–91, 1991–92, 1992–93
- Austrian Cup: 1985–86, 1989–90, 1991–92, 1993–94

VfB Stuttgart

- German Cup: 1996–97
- UEFA Cup Winners' Cup: Runner-up 1997–98
