= Alfred Drabits =

Austrian footballer

Personal information
- Date of birth: 6 April 1959 (age 67)
- Place of birth: Traisen, Austria
- Height: 1.76 m (5 ft 9 1/2 in)
- Position: Forward

Senior career*
Years	Team	Apps	(Gls)
1978–1981	Wiener Sport-Club	100	(45)
1981–1988	FK Austria Wien	197	(96)
1988–1991	First Vienna FC	68	(15)
1997	ASK Bad Vöslau		

International career
1984–1987	Austria	7	(0)
- * Club domestic league appearances and goals

Alfred Drabits (born 6 April 1959) is a retired Austrian footballer who played as a forward.

== Honours ==
Austrian Cup

- 1981-82
- 1985-86

Austrian Football Bundesliga

- 1983–84
- 1984–85
- 1985–86
