= István Magyar (footballer) =

Hungarian footballer (born 1955)

Personal information
- Date of birth: 4 August 1955 (age 71)
- Place of birth: Tiszapüspöki, Hungary
- Height: 1.89 m (6 ft 2 in)
- Position: Forward

Youth career
- –1970: Szolnoki Vegyiművek

Senior career*
Years	Team	Apps	(Gls)
1970–1972	Szolnoki Vegyiművek		
1973–1979	Ferencvárosi	136	(26)
1980–1982	Club Brugge	28	(7)
1982–1984	Austria Wien	48	(8)
1984–1987	SC Eisenstadt		
Total		212	(41)

International career
1975–1979	Hungary	16	(1)
- * Club domestic league appearances and goals

István Magyar (born 4 August 1955) is a Hungarian retired football player and manager. He signed with Ferencváros in 1973 and played there until transferring to Club Brugge in 1980. He made 16 appearances for the Hungary national team from 1975 to 1979, scoring 1 goal.

== Career statistics ==
=== International ===
Appearances and goals by national team and year
National team	Year	Apps	Goals
Hungary	1975	2	0
Hungary	1976	9	1
Hungary	1977	3	0
Hungary	1978	–	
Hungary	1979	2	0
Total		16	1

Scores and results list Hungary's goal tally first, score column indicates score after each Magyar goal.

List of international goals scored by István Magyar
No.	Date	Venue	Opponent	Score	Result	Competition
1	12 June 1976	Népstadion, Budapest, Hungary	Austria	1–0	2–0	Friendly

== Honours ==
Ferencváros

- Nemzeti Bajnokság I: 1975–76
- Hungarian Cup: 1973–74, 1975–76, 1977–78
- Cup Winners' Cup runner-up:: 1974–75

Austria Wien

- Austrian Bundesliga: 1983–84

== Sources ==
- Ki kicsoda a magyar sportéletben?, II. kötet (I–R). Szekszárd, Babits Kiadó, 1995, p. 264., ISBN 963-495-011-6
- Nagy Béla: Fradisták (Sportpropaganda, 1981) ISBN 963-7542-44-2
- Nagy Béla: Fradi futballkönyv (Sportpropaganda, 1985) ISBN 963-7543-04-X
