= Václav Halama =

Czech footballer and coach

Personal information
- Date of birth: 4 November 1940
- Place of birth: Gablonz, Nazi Germany
- Date of death: 8 June 2017 (aged 76)
- Place of death: Cologne, Germany
- Position: Goalkeeper

Youth career
- LIAZ Jablonec

Senior career*
Years	Team	Apps	(Gls)
1964–1969	LIAZ Jablonec		

Managerial career
- 1978–1981: GAK
- 1981–1982: TSV 1860 München
- 1982–1984: FK Austria Wien
- 1984: AEK Athens
- 1984–1986: TSV 1860 München
- 1987–1988: FC Locarno
- 1988–1989: GAK
- * Club domestic league appearances and goals

Václav Halama (also Wenzel Halama, (4 November 1940 – 8 June 2017) was a Czech footballer and coach.

== Honours ==
=== Manager ===
GAK

- Austrian Cup: 1980–81

Austria Wien

- Austrian Football Bundesliga: 1983–84
- Austrian Cup: 1981–82
