= DSV Leoben =

Association football club in Austria

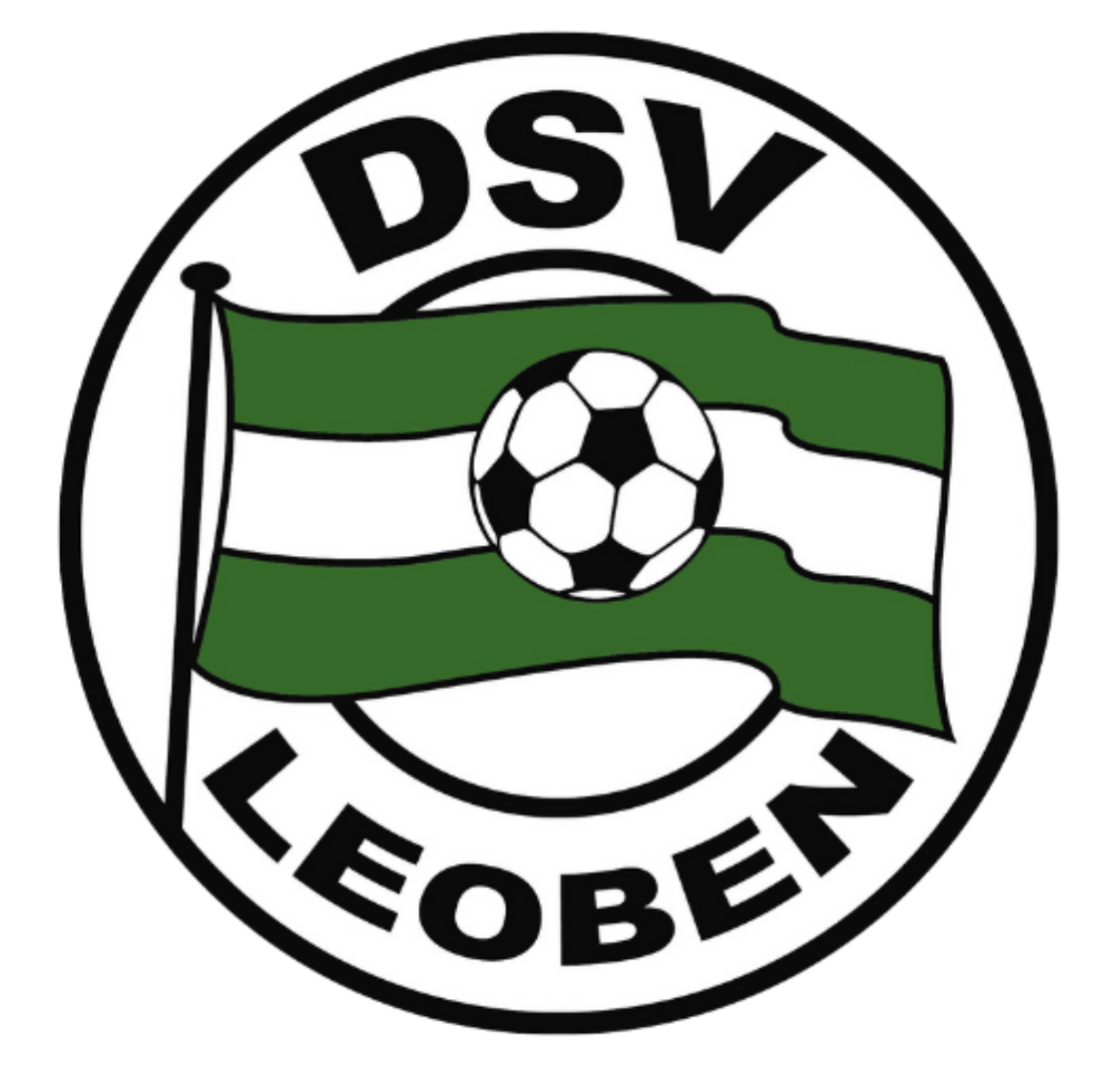
- Full name: Donawitzer Sport Verein Leoben
- Founded: 1928; 98 years ago
- Ground: Donawitz Stadium
- Capacity: 6,000
- Chairman: Peter Krenmayr
- Manager: René Schicker
- League: Landesliga Steiermark
- 2024–25: Regionalliga Central, 7th of 16 (administratively relegated)
Home colours	Away colours

Donawitzer Sport Verein Leoben, simply known as DSV Leoben, is an Austrian association football club based in Leoben. It was founded in 1928. The club currently play in Landesliga Steiermark, one of the fourth tiers of Austrian Football. They play at the Donawitz Stadium.

== History ==
=== WSV Donawitz ===
The club was founded on 1 February 1928 opgericht as Werkssportverein Donawitz, playing in green-white colours. They played their first season at the top Styrian league in 1930/31, playing against the likes of SK Sturm Graz, Grazer AK, Grazer SC and Kapfenberger SC. WSV clinched the title in 1939 but subsequently lost the playoffs for promotion to the Gauliga Ost after losing to FC Wien, Linzer ASK and WSV BU Neunkirchen. That same year, Donawitz town became part of Leoben but WSV kept its name.

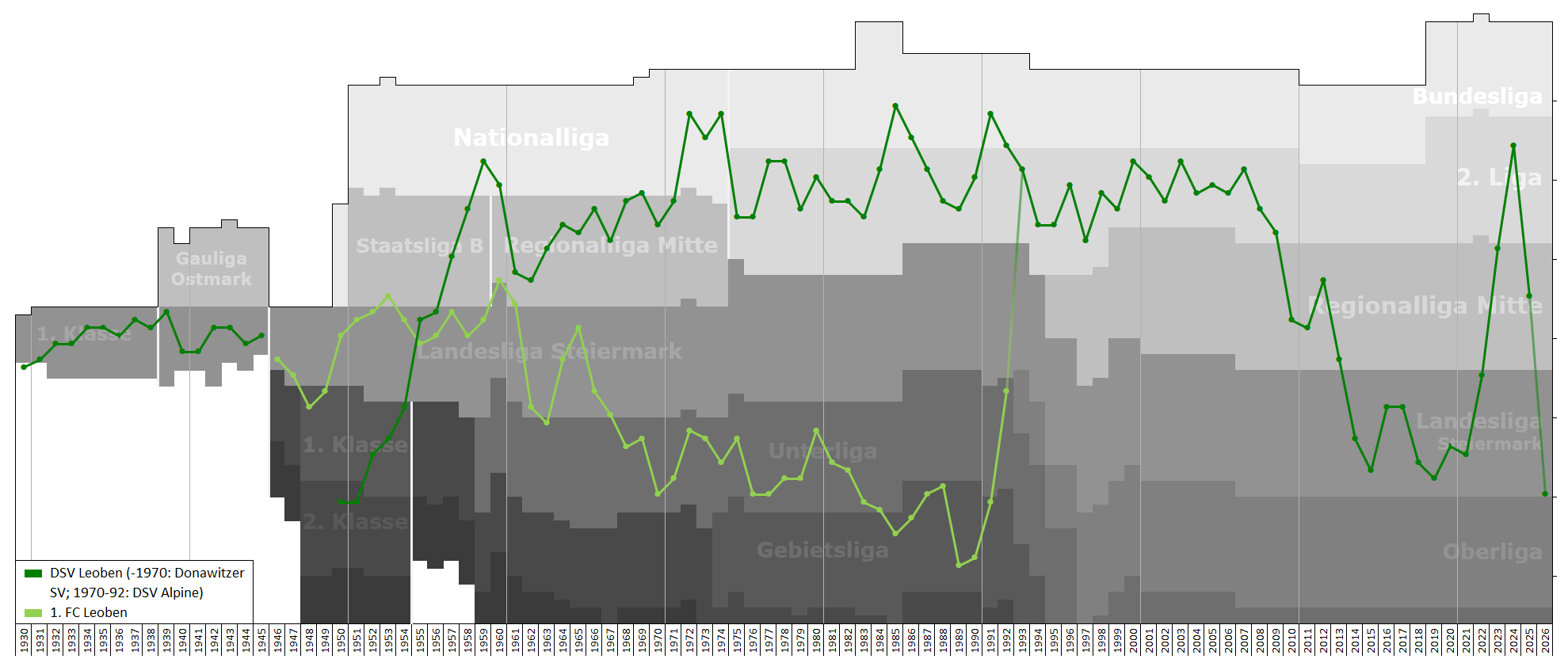
Historical chart of the club's league performance

After World War II, football was restored in Donawitz in 1949 and the club won another league title in 1955 to clinch promotion to the second tier of Austrian football. In 1958 WSV Donawitz won promotion to the top tier, only to be relegated back after two years.

=== DSV Alpine ===
In 1970 the club was renamed WSV Alpine Donawitz and after a year they won promotion back to the country's top tier. On 3 May 1971, the club was renamed again to Donawitzer SV Alpine or just DSV Alpine. They came 6th in the league in 1972 and 1974, but after the 1973/74 season the club was demoted to the 2nd tier after the number of teams in the league was decreased from 17 to 10 clubs and only one team from Styria (Sturm Graz) was included. They only got back to the top tier in 1984 and remained there until 1986 en had they had another spell from 1991 until 1992. They totalled 10 years in the Austrian Bundesliga.

=== DSV Leoben ===
Old Logo

After relegation in 1992, board members of DSV Alpine and 1. FC Leoben decided to merge and the new club DSV Leoben was established on 22 June 1992. Their first success was reaching the 1994/95 Austrian Cup final, which they lost to local giants SK Rapid Wien with former player Peter Guggi at the helm.

They were demoted to the third tier Regionalliga Mitte in 2009, after going into administration.

In 2022–23, DSV Leoben secure promotion to Austrian 2. Liga from 2023 to 2024 after Champions of Regionalliga Mitte in 2022–23.

== Current squad ==
As of 5 September 2024

Note: Flags indicate national team as defined under FIFA eligibility rules; some limited exceptions apply. Players may hold more than one non-FIFA nationality.

No.	Pos.	Nation	Player
4	DF	SVN	Luka Brkic
5	DF	GRE	Denis Thomaj
6	MF	AUT	Nico Pichler
7	MF	AUT	Slobodan Mihajlović
8	FW	AUT	Denis Tomic
9	FW	AUT	Thomas Hirschhofer
10	MF	TUR	Okan Aydın
11	MF	ALB	Drini Halili
16	MF	AUT	Mario Leitgeb
17	DF	AUT	Thorsten Schick
18	MF	AUT	Marco Untergrabner
19	FW	GER	Nathanel Kukanda

No.	Pos.	Nation	Player
20	MF	GER	Danny Kruse
22	MF	AUT	Noah Leitold
23	GK	AUT	Philipp Angeler
24	DF	GER	Timo Perthel
27	MF	CRO	Ilijan Stojcević
28	GK	SVN	Žan Pelko
29	MF	GER	Anıl Aydın
30	FW	AUT	Kevin Friesenbichler
34	GK	AUT	Fabian Kinzl
71	MF	AUT	Thomas Maier
77	MF	AUT	Josip Eskinja

== Managers ==
- (Austria) Bino Skasa ()
- (Austria) Hans Grassl (1949)
- Rudi Oblak (1950–1951)
- (Austria) Toni Heubrandner (1952–1953)
- (Austria) Toni Linhart Sr. (1954)
- (Austria) Toni Heubrandner (1955)
- (Austria) Ludwig Durek (1956)
- (Austria) Schani Kandler (1957–1959)
- (Austria) Kotzmuth (1960)
- (Austria) Harry Rauch (1960)
- (Austria) Albert Puschnik (1961–62)
- (Austria) Toni Linhart Sr. (1962)
- (Austria) Werner Pichler (1963)
- (Austria) Toni Linhart Sr. (1963–65)
- (Austria) Toni Heubrandner (1965–66)
- (Hungary) Lajos Lörinczy (1967–68)
- (Czechoslovakia) František Korček (1968–69)
- (Czechoslovakia) Alfréd Sezemský (1970)
- (Austria) Fritz Pfister (1971–72)
- (Austria) Gerd Springer (1972–73)
- (Czechoslovakia) František Bufka (1973–74)
- (Austria) Harry Rauch (1974–76)
- (Austria) Gerd Springer (1976–77)
- Fuchs (1977–78)
- Huber (1978)
- (Austria) Harry Rauch (1978)
- (Bulgaria) Stoyan Ormandzhiev (1979–80)
- (Socialist Federal Republic of Yugoslavia) Ivica Brzić (1980–81)
- Peintinger (1981–82)
- Przybylinski (1982–83)
- (Austria) Harry Rauch (1983)
- Hadler (1983)
- (Austria) Hans Windisch (1983–85)
- (Austria) Günther Klug (1985)
- (Austria) Heinz Binder (1985–86)
- (Austria) Franz Mikscha (1986–87)
- (Austria) Karl Hofmeister (1987)
- (Austria) Hans Windisch (1987–1988)
- (Socialist Federal Republic of Yugoslavia) Milan Miklavič (1989–1991)
- (Germany) Gerd Struppert (1991)
- (Croatia) Milan Đuričić (1991–1993)
- (Austria) Ivo Gölz (1993)
- (Czechoslovakia) Josef Hloušek (1993)
- (Slovenia) Milan Miklavič (1994–1995)
- (Germany) Heinz Eisengrein (1995)
- (Austria) Andreas Leutschacher (1995)
- (Austria) Wolfsche (1995)
- (Croatia) Milan Đuričić (1995–96)
- (Austria) Wolfsche (1996)
- (Bosnia and Herzegovina) Savo Ekmečić (1996–97)
- (Austria) Helmut Kirisits (1997–98)
- (Austria) Günter Kronsteiner (1998–99)
- (Croatia) Milan Đuričić (1999–2001)
- (Croatia) Petar Šegrt (2001–03)
- (Austria) Heinz Thonhofer (2003–05)
- (Austria) Dejan Stanković (2005–07)
- (Austria) Manfred Kohlbacher (2007)
- (Austria) Walter Kogler (2007–08)
- (Austria) Heimo Kump (2008–09)
- (Austria) Dejan Stanković (2009)
- (Austria) Richard Niederbacher (2009–10)
- (Austria) Andreas Kindlinger (2010–11)
- (Austria) Gregor Pötscher (2011–12)
- (Austria) Bernhard Muhr (2012)
- (Austria) Adi Pinter (2012)
- (Austria) Manfred Unger (2012)
- (Austria) Jürgen Auffinger (2012)
- (Austria) Heinz Karner (2012–13)
- (Austria) Gregor Pötscher (2013–2015)
- (Austria) Markus Vögl (2015)
- (Austria) Jürgen Auffinger (2015–18)
- (Austria) Gottfried Jantschgi - caretaker (2018)
- (Austria) Helmut Kalander (2018)
- (Austria) Gottfried Jantschgi - caretaker (2018)
- (Austria) Helmut Kalander (2018)
- (Austria) Jürgen Kogler (2018)
- (Austria) Hannes Reinmayr (2018–19)
- (Austria) Ivo Gölz (2019–20)
- (Austria) Markus Rebernegg (2020–21)
- (Germany) Carsten Jancker (2021–23)
- (Austria) René Poms (2023–)
