= FC St. Veit =

- Full name: Fußball Club Sankt Veit
- Founded: 1950
- Dissolved: 2016 (main team); 2019
- Ground: Jacques Lemans Arena, Sankt Veit an der Glan
- Capacity: 2,420
- Head coach: Robert Oberhauser
- League: 2. Landesliga South
- 2023–24: 2. Landesliga South, 11th of 14
Home colours

FC St. Veit was an Austrian association football club from Sankt Veit an der Glan, Carinthia. It was founded in 1989 as a merger of two local clubs, SV St. Veit/Glan, founded in 1950, and SC Amateure St. Veit/Glan, founded in 1966. It played in the Sixth Division, and in 2014 the team was renamed FC Alpe Adria until 2016 when it disbanded its senior team.

== Bibliography ==
- Philipp Novak (2009), Das 90. Jahr St. Veit und seine Fußballgeschichte(n) (in German), FC St. Veit
