= Grazer AK =

Austrian football club, based in Graz

- Full name: Grazer Athletiksport Klub
- Nicknames: Die Roten (The Reds); Die Roten Teufel (The Red Devils); Rotjacken (Red Jackets); Athletiker (Athletics)
- Short name: GAK
- Founded: 18 August 1902; 124 years ago
- Ground: Merkur-Arena
- Capacity: 16,364
- President: Réne Ziesler
- Head coach: Gerald Scheiblehner
- League: Austrian Bundesliga
- 2025–26: Austrian Bundesliga, 10th of 12
- Website: www.grazerak.at
Home colours	Away colours	Third colours

Grazer Athletiksport-Klub (lit. 'Graz's Athletic Sport Club'; abbreviated as GAK), better known simply as Grazer AK, is an Austrian sports club based in the city of Graz in the federal state of Styria. The football section was once among Austria's most popular clubs, enjoying success in the decade between 1995 and 2005. The other sections are basketball, diving and tennis, which however all act as separate legal entities. The "GAK" football section folded during the 2012–13 Regionalliga Mitte Season in Autumn 2012. It has since been revived and returned to the Austrian Second League in 2019, and four years later won promotion to the Austrian Bundesliga after a seventeen-year hiatus.

== History ==
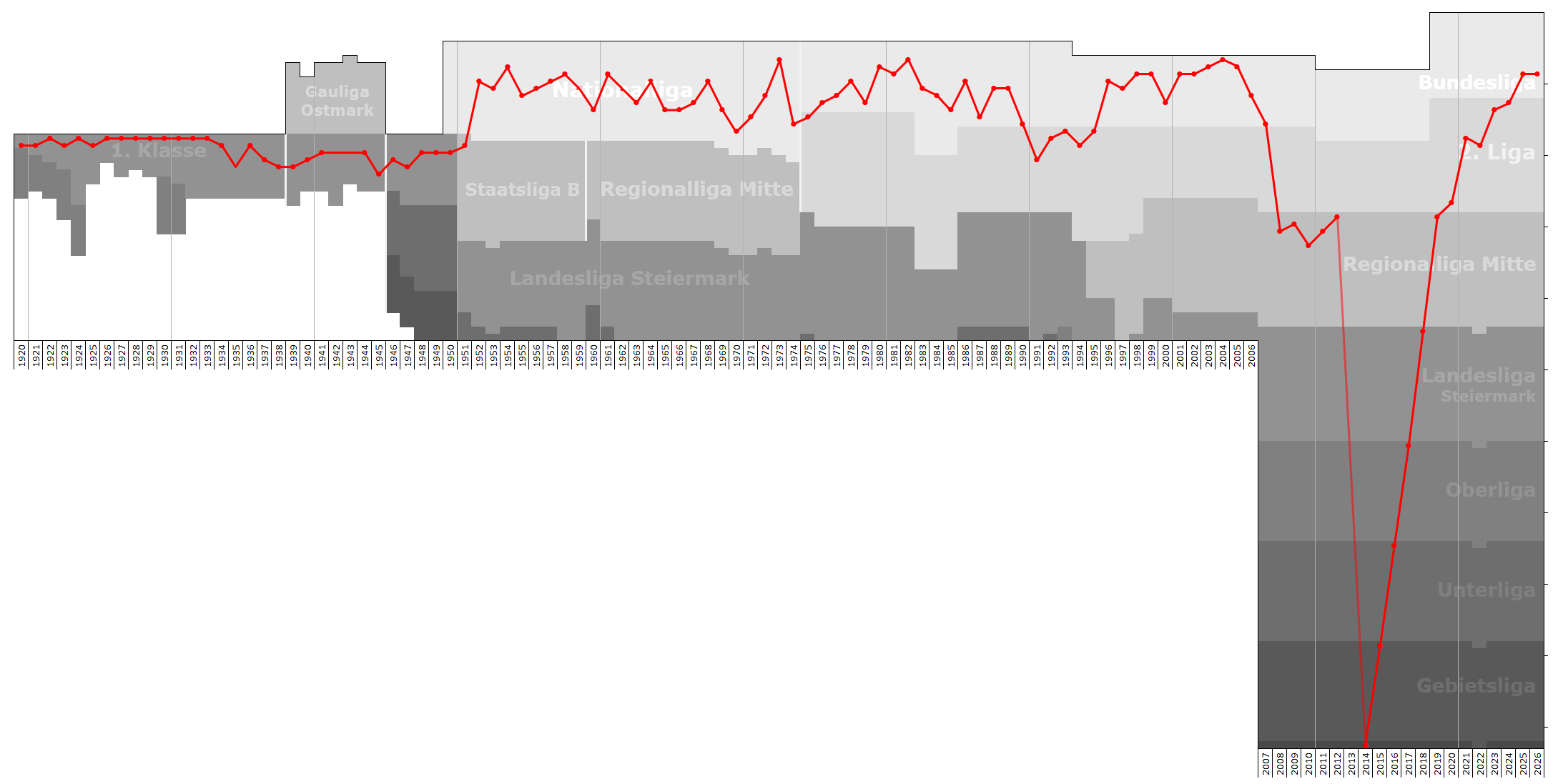
Historical chart of GAK league performance

=== The beginning ===
The club arose from an informal association of local academics around the medical student Georg August Wagner from Prague, later a professor at Charles University and the Charité in Berlin. Acquainted with football from his hometown, he organised the first public match in present-day Austria on 18 March 1894 in the Graz municipal park. The Grazer Athletik-Sport-Club – modeled after the Wiener AC – was established eight years later on the 72nd birthday of Emperor Francis Joseph.

=== European football and the golden start to the new millennium ===
Between 1962 and 1983, GAK was involved in European competitions. Their first match was against Odense BK in the Cup Winners Cup in 1962. The club has made regular appearances in European cups ever since, with regular UEFA Cup appearances since the 1980s, but the highlight came on the domestic scene in 1981 when they won the Austrian Cup. The golden years arrived in the first half of the 2000s, when GAK won the Austrian Cup twice more, in 2000 and 2002. Their biggest success was in 2004 where they did the double – they managed to win the cup yet again along with the Austrian title, finishing the league season one point ahead of Austria Wien. Their last appearance in Europe was a disappointing 5–0 away defeat to RC Strasbourg in Round 1 of the UEFA Cup in the 2005–06 season.

=== Financial troubles and bankruptcy ===
During the 2006–2007 season, 'Grazer AK' went into administration. The club was docked 28 points as a result. In the 2007–2008 season, the club was not allowed to participate in the professional leagues and was relegated to the Austrian Regional League Central. After a second bankruptcy, the club managed to achieve a settlement and accommodation with its creditors in September 2008, ensuring its survival. Soon after, the club started having difficulties again after it could not recover from its relegation to the Regional League and was eventually dissolved in 2012.

=== New start ===
A phoenix club called Grazer AC was set up by the fans soon after the 2012 dissolution called and started from the bottom tier in the 2013–14 season. At an extraordinary meeting on 14 March 2014, Grazer AC was declared to be a continuation of the original "GAK" in agreement with its umbrella association. After winning every single championship, the club made its return to professional football in the 2019–20 season with promotion to the second tier.

== Supporters ==
The Reds recorded their highest average attendance (9234) in 2003/2004. The average attendance since the forced relegations had settled at around 3500, but the quality of the organized support had risen. The "curve" was in sector 22, before relegation to the Regionalliga in sector 25. Despite relegation to the third tier, several hundred fans attended away games. The ultra fan groups are known as Society Graz 06, Sezione Follia Malata (Part of Society), Rote Armee Graz, Roter Westen and Kommando 23. Parts of the fan scene maintain friendships with Krefeld Pinguine, NK Čelik Zenica and SV Austria Salzburg and FC Zlín and NK Maribor

== Graz Derby ==
GAK have an important rivalry with cross-town rivals Sturm Graz, with whom they contest the Graz derby. In 1974, there was significant opposition from both sets of fans against a proposed merger to become FC Graz. Since 1920, excluding the friendly matches (especially before the first official Styrian Cup in 1920), 199 matches have been played between the two, of which there were: 185 encounters in the league (130 at the professional level and 55 at amateur level in the Styrian League); an additional seven encounters in Austrian Cup (including one final that was won by the GAK in 2002); 1 match in the Austrian Supercup; 2 meetings in the Tschammerpokal and 4 games in the Styrian Cup. The first derby took place in 1911 and the most recent on 2 November 2023. The Red Devils have the superior record in the rivalry. On 19 October 2022, a long period without a derby ended when the two clubs met in the last 16 of the ÖFB-Cup.

== Past seasons ==
Positions since the team was re-founded at the end of 2012.

Season	League	Level	Place	MP	W	D	L	GF	GA	GD	Pts	Austrian Cup
2013–14	1. Klasse Mitte A (VIII)	8	1	22	20	2	0	124	12	112	62	not qualified
2014–15	Gebietsliga Mitte (VII)	7	1	26	23	1	2	107	29	78	70	not qualified
2015–16	Unterliga Mitte (VI)	6	1	26	22	3	1	88	19	69	69	not qualified
2016–17	Oberliga Mitte/West (V)	5	1	26	14	9	3	65	29	36	51	not qualified
2017–18	Landesliga Steiermark (IV)	4	1	30	21	5	4	61	24	37	68	not qualified
2018–19	Regionalliga Mitte (III)	3	1	30	21	5	4	70	28	42	68	Semi-finals
2019–20	First League (II)	2	15	30	7	10	13	40	50	-10	31	Second round
2020–21	First League (II)	2	6	30	13	7	10	46	42	4	46	First round
2021–22	First League (II)	2	7	30	13	7	10	47	39	8	46	First round
2022–23	First League (II)	2	2	30	17	9	4	52	29	23	60	Third round
2023–24	First League (II)	2	1	30	21	6	3	57	27	30	69	Third round
2024–25	Bundesliga (I)	1	11	22	3	7	12	27	45	-18	16	Third round
Green marks a season followed by promotion

== European competition ==
=== Results ===
Season	Competition	Round	Opponent	Aggregate	1st leg	2nd leg
1962–63	UEFA Cup Winners Cup	Round 2	(Denmark) B 1909 Odense	4:6	1:1 (H)	3:5 (A)
1964–65	Inter-Cities Fairs Cup	Round 1	(Socialist Federal Republic of Yugoslavia) NK Zagreb	2:9	2:3 (A)	0:6 (H)
1968–69	UEFA Cup Winners Cup	Round 1	(Netherlands) ADO Den Haag	1:6	1:4 (A)	0:2 (H)
1973–74	UEFA Cup	Round 1	(Greece) Panachaiki	1:3	0:1 (H)	1:2 (A)
1981–82	UEFA Cup Winners Cup	Round 1	(Soviet Union) Dinamo Tbilisi	2:4	0:2 (A)	2:2 (H)
1982–83	UEFA Cup	Round 1	(Romania) Corvinul Hunedoara	1:4	1:1 (H)	0:3 (A)
1996–97	UEFA Cup	Qualification	(Socialist Federal Republic of Yugoslavia) Vojvodina	7:1	2:0 (H)	5:1 (A)
1996–97	UEFA Cup	Round 1	(Belgium) Germinal Ekeren	(a) 3:3	1:3 (A)	2:0 (H)
1996–97	UEFA Cup	Round 2	(Italy) Inter Milan	1:1 (3:5 p)	0:1 (A)	1:0 a.e.t. (3:5 p) (H)
1997	UEFA Intertoto Cup	Group stage	(Denmark) Silkeborg IF	5:4	2:0 (H)	
1997	UEFA Intertoto Cup	Group stage	(Wales) Ebbw Vale	5:4	0:0 (A)	
1997	UEFA Intertoto Cup	Group stage	(Croatia) NK Hrvatski Dragovoljac	5:4	1:3 (H)	
1997	UEFA Intertoto Cup	Group stage	(France) SC Bastia	5:4	2:1 (A)	
1998–99	UEFA Cup	Qualifying Round 2	(Finland) VPS	3:0	0:0 (A)	3:0 (H)
1998–99	UEFA Cup	Round 1	(Bulgaria) Litex Lovech	3:1	1:1 (A)	2:0 (H)
1998–99	UEFA Cup	Round 2	(France) AS Monaco	3:7	3:3 (H)	0:4 (A)
1999–00	UEFA Cup	Qualifying Round 2	(Faroe Islands) KÍ Klaksvík	9:0	5:0 (A)	4:0 (H)
1999–00	UEFA Cup	Round 1	(Slovakia) FC Spartak Trnava	4:2	3:0 (H)	1:2 (A)
1999–00	UEFA Cup	Round 2	(Greece) Panathinaikos	(a) 2:2	2:1 (H)	0:1 (A)
2000–01	UEFA Cup	Round 1	(Slovakia) 1. FC Košice	3:2	3:2 (A)	0:0 (H)
2000–01	UEFA Cup	Round 2	(Spain) Espanyol	1:4	0:4 (A)	1:0 (H)
2001–02	UEFA Cup	Qualifikation	(Faroe Islands) HB Tórshavn	6:2	2:2 (A)	4:0 (H)
2001–02	UEFA Cup	Round 2	(Netherlands) FC Utrecht	3:6	0:3 (A)	3:3 (H)
2002–03	UEFA Champions League	Qualifying Round 2	(Moldova) Sheriff Tiraspol	6:1	4:1 (A)	2:0 (H)
2002–03	UEFA Champions League	Qualifying Round 3	(Russia) Lokomotiv Moscow	3:5	0:2 (H)	3:3 (A)
2002–03	UEFA Cup	Round 1	(Cyprus) APOEL	1:3	0:2 (A)	1:1 (H)
2003–04	UEFA Champions League	Qualifying Round 2	(Albania) Tirana	7:2	5:1 (A)	2:1 (H)
2003–04	UEFA Champions League	Qualifying Round 3	(Netherlands) Ajax	2:3	1:1 (H)	1:2 (s.g.) (A)
2003–04	UEFA Cup	Round 1	(Norway) Vålerenga IF	1:1 (a)	0:0 (A)	1:1 (H)
2004–05	UEFA Champions League	Qualifying Round 3	(England) Liverpool	1:2	0:2 (H)	1:0 (A)
2004–05	UEFA Cup	Round 1	(Bulgaria) Litex Lovech	5:1	5:0 (H)	0:1 (A)
2004–05	UEFA Cup	Group stage	(France) AJ Auxerre	5:4	0:0 (A)	
2004–05	UEFA Cup	Group stage	(Poland) Amica Wronki	5:4	3:1 (H)	
2004–05	UEFA Cup	Group stage	(Scotland) Rangers	5:4	0:3 (A)	
2004–05	UEFA Cup	Group stage	(Netherlands) AZ Alkmaar	5:4	2:0 (H)	
2004–05	UEFA Cup	1/16 finals	(England) Middlesbrough	3:4	2:2 (H)	1:2 (A)
2005–06	UEFA Cup	Qualifying Round 2	(Moldova) Nistru Otaci	3:0	2:0 (A)	1:0 (H)
2005–06	UEFA Cup	Round 1	(France) Strasbourg	0:7	0:2 (H)	0:5 (A)

=== Derby statistics vs. SK Sturm Graz ===
Total in Austrian first tier as of 23 August 2005:

- 46 Won
- 42 Drawn
- 42 Lost

(Goals: 174:168)

== Current squad ==
As of 8 September 2026

Note: Flags indicate national team as defined under FIFA eligibility rules; some limited exceptions apply. Players may hold more than one non-FIFA nationality.

No.	Pos.	Nation	Player
1	GK	AUT	Jakob Meierhofer
2	DF	USA	Donovan Pines
3	DF	DEN	Ludwig Vraa
6	MF	ISR	Liam Hermesh
7	FW	NED	Anthony Smits
8	MF	AUT	Tobias Koch
9	FW	AUT	Daniel Maderner
10	MF	AUT	Christian Lichtenberger
11	MF	AUT	Mark Grosse
14	DF	AUS	Jacob Italiano
17	MF	AUT	Souleyman Mandey
21	DF	AUT	Michael Sollbauer
23	GK	AUT	Cican Stanković

No.	Pos.	Nation	Player
24	MF	AUT	Christopher Cvetko
25	FW	AUT	Alexander Hofleitner
26	GK	AUT	Christoph Nicht
27	DF	GER	Yannick Oberleitner
28	DF	BRA	Anderson
29	MF	MAR	Ismaël Guerti
32	DF	RUS	Leon Klassen
34	MF	AUT	Peter Michorl
37	DF	AUT	Tim Trummer (on loan from Red Bull Salzburg)
48	DF	AUT	Matthias Gragger
72	DF	AUT	Petar Markovic
82	DF	FRA	Beres Owusu (on loan from Saint-Étienne)

=== Out on loan ===
Note: Flags indicate national team as defined under FIFA eligibility rules; some limited exceptions apply. Players may hold more than one non-FIFA nationality.

No.	Pos.	Nation	Player
—	GK	AUT	Juri Kirchmayr (at Wacker Innsbruck until 30 June 2027)

== Managerial history ==
- (Austria) Karl Mütsch (1948–1951)
- (Austria) Josef Pojar (1951–1952)
- (Austria) Engelbert Smutny (1952)
- (Austria) Karl Mütsch (1953–1954)
- (Austria) Alfred Pestitschek (1954–1957)
- (Hungary) (Austria) János Szép (1957–1960)
- (Austria) Ferdinand Fritsch (1960–1962)
- (Chile) (Hungary) Juan Schwanner (1962–1963)
- (Austria) Friedrich Pimperl (1963–1964)
- (Socialist Federal Republic of Yugoslavia) Milan Zeković (1964)
- (Austria) Karl Durspekt (1964–1965)
- (Austria) Karl Kowanz (1965–1967)
- (Austria) Fritz Kominek (1967–1969)
- (Socialist Federal Republic of Yugoslavia) Vlado Šimunić (1969–1970)
- (Austria) Karl Durspekt (1970–1971)
- (Austria) Helmut Senekowitsch (1971–1973)
- (Austria) Alfred Günthner (1973–1974)
- (Austria) Hans Hipp (1974–1975)
- (Austria) Hermann Stessl (1975–1977)
- (Austria) Hermann Repitsch (interim) (1977)
- (Austria) Gerd Springer (1977–1978)
- (Austria) Walter Koleznik (interim) (1978)
- (Czechoslovakia) (Austria) Václav Halama (1978–1981)
- (Socialist Federal Republic of Yugoslavia) Zlatko Čajkovski (1981–1982)
- (Austria) August Starek (1982–1984)
- (Austria) Helmut Senekowitsch (1984–1985)
- (Austria) Gernot Fraydl (1985–1986)
- (Austria) Adolf Blutsch (1986–1987)
- (Austria) Adi Pinter (1987–1988)
- (Czechoslovakia) (Austria) Václav Halama (1988–1989)
- (Austria) Karl Philipp (1989)
- (Austria) Adi Pinter (1989–1990)
- (Austria) Heinz Binder (1990)
- (Bosnia and Herzegovina) Savo Ekmečić (1990–1992)
- (Slovenia) Milan Miklavič (1992–1993)
- (Germany) Hans Ulrich Thomale (1993–1996)
- (Federal Republic of Yugoslavia) Ljupko Petrović (1996)
- (Austria) Hans Peter Schaller (1996)
- (Austria) August Starek (1996–1997)
- (Germany) Klaus Augenthaler (1997–2000)
- (Germany) Rainer Hörgl (2000)
- (Austria) Werner Gregoritsch (2000–2001)
- (Austria) Christian Keglevits (2001)
- (Netherlands) Thijs Libregts (2001–2002)
- (Austria) Christian Keglevits (2002)
- (Austria) Walter Schachner (2002–2006)
- (Denmark) Lars Søndergaard (2006–2007)
- (Austria) Dietmar Pegam (2007)
- (Austria) Stojadin Rajković (2008)
- (Austria) Gregor Pötscher (2008–2010)
- (Austria) Heinz Karner (2010)
- (Austria) Peter Stöger (2010–2011)
- (Slovenia) Aleš Čeh (2011–2012)
- (Slovenia) Ante Šimundža (2012)
- (Austria) David Preiß (9 October 2017 – 25 February 2020)
- (Austria) Gernot Plassnegger (2020–2021)
- (Austria) Gernot Messner (2021–2024)
- (Austria) René Poms (2024–2025)
- (Austria) Ferdinand Feldhofer (2025–present)

== Honours ==
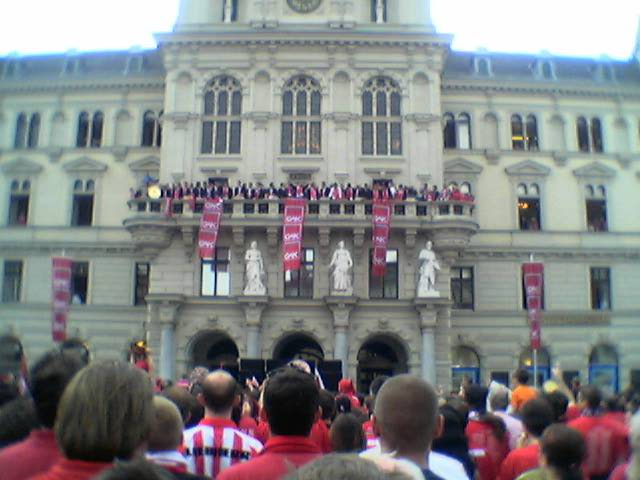
GAK celebrates its Austrian Championship 2004 at Hauptplatz in Graz.

- Austrian Bundesliga (I)
  - Winners (1): 2003–04
  - Runners-up (2): 2002–03, 2004–05
- Austrian Cup
  - Winners (4): 1980–81, 1999–2000, 2001–02, 2003–04
  - Runners-up (2): 1961–62, 1967–68
- Austrian Supercup
  - Winners (2): 2000, 2002
  - Runners-up (1): 2004
- Austrian First League (II)
  - Winners (4): 1974–75, 1992–93, 1994–95, 2023–24
- Austrian Regionalliga Mitte (III)
  - Winners (2): 2011–12, 2018–19
- Landesliga Steiermark (IV)
  - Winners (1): 2017–18
- Oberliga Mitte/West (V)
  - Winners (1): 2016–17
- Unterliga Mitte (VI)
  - Winners (1): 2015–16
- Gebietsliga Mitte (VII)
  - Winners (1): 2014–15
- 1. Klasse Mitte A (VIII)
  - Winners (1): 2013–14
