= 2000–01 SK Rapid Wien season =

Rapid Wien
2000–01 season
- President: Peter Weber
- Coach: Ernst Dokupil
- Stadium: Gerhard Hanappi Stadium, Vienna, Austria
- Bundesliga: 2nd
- ÖFB-Cup: Semifinals
- UEFA Cup: 2nd round
- Top goalscorer: League: Roman Wallner (11); All: Roman Wallner (13); René Wagner (13)
- Highest home attendance: 18,200
- Lowest home attendance: 3,000

The 2000–01 SK Rapid Wien season is the 103rd season in club history.

== Squad statistics ==
No.	Nat.	Name	Age	League		Cup		UEFA Cup		Total		Discipline	
No.	Nat.	Name	Age	Apps	Goals	Apps	Goals	Apps	Goals	Apps	Goals	Booked	Sent off (straight red)
Goalkeepers
1	(Czech Republic)	Ladislav Maier	34	33		4		6		43		4	
22	(Austria)	Raimund Hedl	25	3		0+1				3+1			
Defenders
4	(Austria)	Günter Schießwald	26	21+2	1	1	1	6		28+2	2	2	2
5	(Austria)	Peter Schöttel	33	18+6	1	3		3+2	1	24+8	2	12	1
14	(Austria)	Michael Hatz	29	25+5		1		4		30+5		7	
16	(Poland)	Krzysztof Ratajczyk	26	34	3	4		6	1	44	4	5	
Midfielders
2	(Austria)	Andreas Ivanschitz	16	7+7	2	0+2		0+2		7+11	2		
3	(Germany)	Oliver Freund	30	11		3				14		6	
7	(Germany)	Jens Dowe	32	23+5	6	0+1		5		28+6	6	4	
8	(Austria)	Oliver Lederer	22	4+7		0+1				4+8		3	
11	(Greece)	Andreas Lagonikakis	28	20+5	5	2		3+2	1	25+7	6	10	1
12	(Austria)	Jürgen Saler	22	15+1	1	2	1	2		19+1	2	3	
13	(Canada)	Ante Jazic	24	13		4	1			17	1	4	
15	(Austria)	Arnold Wetl	30	18+9	4	3+1	1	4	2	25+10	7	3	
19	(Austria)	Thomas Zingler	29	26+1	2	3		6		35+1	2	10	2
20	(Austria)	Jürgen Kauz	25	17+1				4+1		21+2		9	
21	(Austria)	Zeljko Radovic	26	18+12	5	1+2	1	4+2	1	23+16	7	5	1
26	(Austria)	Ümit Erbay	19										
Forwards
6	(Austria)	Roman Wallner	18	19+10	11	4	2	2+1		25+11	13	5	
9	(Netherlands)	Gaston Taument	29	31+5	3	4		5+1		40+6	3	3	
10	(Federal Republic of Yugoslavia)	Dejan Savicevic	33	17+5	7	3		2+1	1	22+6	8	9	1
17	(Czech Republic)	René Wagner	27	18+4	8	2+2	1	4	4	24+6	13	5	1
18	(Austria)	Florian Schwarz	23	5+8	3	0+2		0+2		5+12	3	1	

=== Goal scorers ===
Rank	Name	Bundesliga	Cup	UEFA Cup	Total
1	(Czech Republic) Rene Wagner	8	1	4	13
1	(Austria) Roman Wallner	11	2		13
3	(Federal Republic of Yugoslavia) Dejan Savicevic	7		1	8
4	(Austria) Zeljko Radovic	5	1	1	7
4	(Austria) Arnold Wetl	4	1	2	7
6	(Germany) Jens Dowe	6			6
6	(Greece) Andreas Lagonikakis	5		1	6
8	(Poland) Krzysztof Ratajczyk	3		1	4
9	(Austria) Florian Schwarz	3			3
9	(Netherlands) Gaston Taument	3			3
11	(Austria) Andreas Ivanschitz	2			2
11	(Austria) Jürgen Saler	1	1		2
11	(Austria) Günter Schießwald	1	1		2
11	(Austria) Peter Schöttel	1	1		2
11	(Austria) Thomas Zingler	1	1		2
16	(Canada) Ante Jazic		1		1
OG	(Austria) Baumann (Langenrohr)		1		1
Totals		62	9	11	82

== Fixtures and results ==
Win Draw Loss

=== Bundesliga ===
Rd	Date	Venue	Opponent	Res.	Att.	Goals and discipline
1	05.07.2000	A	Austria Salzburg	3-0	6,000	Wagner R. 14', Taument 21', Radovic 84'
2	12.07.2000	H	Sturm Graz	4-1	12,500	Dowe 29', Radovic 51' 71', Wagner R. 57'
3	18.07.2000	H	LASK	2-0	10,400	Taument 50', Dowe 76'
4	26.07.2000	A	SW Bregenz	1-1	4,300	Zingler 44'
5	29.07.2000	H	GAK	1-1	7,300	Dowe 7'
6	02.08.2000	A	Admira	4-2	5,500	Wagner R. 11' 31' (pen.), Lagonikakis 29', Dowe 52'
7	13.08.2000	H	Austria Wien	1-1	18,200	Radovic 22'
8	20.08.2000	A	Ried	3-2	5,000	Wagner R. 1' 74' (pen.), Wetl 67'; Schießwald (red card) 23'
9	27.08.2000	H	FC Tirol	2-1	9,300	Wetl 52', Ratajczyk 90+1'
10	08.09.2000	A	FC Tirol	0-1	16,000	Radovic (yellow card) 66' (red card) , Wagner R. (red card) 78'
11	16.09.2000	H	Austria Salzburg	3-0	7,800	Saler 13', Schwarz 59' 60'
12	24.09.2000	A	Sturm Graz	1-1	12,200	Zingler 29'
13	01.10.2000	A	LASK	1-2	8,000	Radovic 17'; Zingler (yellow card) 62' (red card)
14	14.10.2000	H	SW Bregenz	2-1	5,300	Savicevic 47', Wallner 88'
15	20.10.2000	A	GAK	0-2	9,640	
16	28.10.2000	H	Admira	1-0	3,900	Wallner 66'
17	01.11.2000	A	Austria Wien	2-3	11,100	Taument 24', Wallner 38'
18	29.11.2000	H	Ried	2-1	3,200	Wallner 10' (pen.), Schwarz 70'
19	12.11.2000	A	GAK	1-0	10,000	Savicevic 78'
20	19.11.2000	H	FC Tirol	2-2	12,300	Savicevic 32' (pen.), Schießwald 77'
21	24.11.2000	A	LASK	3-3	4,500	Savicevic 20' 72', Wallner 74'; Schießwald (yellow card) 60' (red card)
22	02.12.2000	H	SW Bregenz	5-0	4,000	Ivanschitz 25', Dowe 29', Wallner 67', Lagonikakis 73', Ratajczyk 90'
23	04.03.2001	A	Austria Wien	0-2	11,000	Lagonikakis (yellow card) 62' (red card)
24	09.03.2001	H	Admira	1-2	5,300	Ivanschitz 7'
25	14.03.2001	A	Austria Salzburg	3-0	8,000	Savicevic 45', Lagonikakis 76', Wagner R. 90+1'
26	18.03.2001	H	Sturm Graz	0-0	14,300	Schöttel (yellow card) 42' (red card)
27	31.03.2001	H	Ried	1-1	5,800	Wagner R. 86'
28	08.04.2001	A	Ried	0-2	4,000	
29	14.04.2001	H	GAK	1-1	3,000	Wallner 62'
30	21.04.2001	A	FC Tirol	1-1	18,200	Schöttel 41' (pen.)
31	28.04.2001	H	LASK	6-0	4,000	Lagonikakis 28' 74', Wetl 35', Savicevic 44', Wallner 51', Dowe 79'
32	01.05.2001	A	SW Bregenz	0-1	6,100	
33	06.05.2001	H	Austria Wien	2-0	14,400	Ratajczyk 36', Wallner 79'
34	12.05.2001	A	Admira	2-0	5,500	Wetl 45' (pen.), Wallner 86'
35	19.05.2001	H	Austria Salzburg	0-0	7,200	
36	24.05.2001	A	Sturm Graz	1-1	15,400	Wallner 61'

==== League table ====
Pos	Team	Pld	W	D	L	GF	GA	GD	Pts	Qualification or relegation
1	Tirol Innsbruck (C)	36	20	8	8	63	31	+32	68	Qualification to Champions League third qualifying round
2	Rapid Wien	36	16	12	8	62	36	+26	60	Qualification to UEFA Cup qualifying round
3	Grazer AK	36	16	9	11	49	40	+9	57	Qualification to UEFA Cup qualifying round
4	Sturm Graz	36	16	7	13	58	44	+14	55	Qualification to Intertoto Cup second round
5	Austria Wien	36	14	8	14	47	43	+4	50	

Source: weltfussball.de (in German)
Rules for classification: 1) points; 2) goal difference; 3) number of goals scored.
(C) Champions

=== Cup ===
Rd	Date	Venue	Opponent	Res.	Att.	Goals and discipline
R3	03.04.2001	A	Langenrohr	4-0	3,600	Radovic 51', Wetl 60', Wagner R. 63', Baumann 72' (o.g.)
R16	10.04.2001	A	Kapfenberg	3-2	3,500	Wallner 30', Jazic 43', Schießwald 89'; Zingler (red card) 67'
QF	17.04.2001	A	Sturm Graz	2-2 (4-3 p)	10,572	Saler 22', Wallner 75'
SF	09.05.2001	H	FC Tirol	0-1	16,000	Savicevic (red card) 90+2'

=== UEFA Cup ===
Rd	Date	Venue	Opponent	Res.	Att.	Goals and discipline
Q2-L1	10.08.2000	H	Teuta Durrës (Albania)	2-0	5,500	Wagner R. 51', Schöttel 78'
Q2-L2	24.08.2000	A	Teuta Durrës (Albania)	4-0	4,000	Lagonikakis 21', Wetl 26' 77', Wagner R. 66'
R1-L1	12.09.2000	H	Örgryte (Sweden)	3-0	6,000	Wagner R. 20', Savicevic 27', Ratajczyk 81'
R1-L2	28.09.2000	A	Örgryte (Sweden)	1-1	1,700	Wagner R. 61'
R2-L1	24.10.2000	A	NK Osijek (Croatia)	1-2	10,000	Radovic 37'
R2-L2	07.11.2000	H	NK Osijek (Croatia)	0-2	12,000	
