= 1999–2000 SK Rapid Wien season =

Rapid Wien
1999–2000 season
- President: Peter Weber
- Coach: Heribert Weber
- Stadium: Gerhard Hanappi Stadium, Vienna, Austria
- Bundesliga: 3rd
- ÖFB-Cup: 2nd round
- Champions League: 3rd qualifying round
- UEFA Cup: 1st round
- Top goalscorer: League: René Wagner (17); All: René Wagner (17)
- Highest home attendance: 35,700
- Lowest home attendance: 3,000

The 1999–2000 SK Rapid Wien season is the 102nd season in club history.

== Squad statistics ==
No.	Nat.	Name	Age	League		Cup		UEFA Competitions		Total		Discipline	
No.	Nat.	Name	Age	Apps	Goals	Apps	Goals	Apps	Goals	Apps	Goals	Booked	Sent off (straight red)
Goalkeepers
1	(Czech Republic)	Ladislav Maier	33	35		1		6		42			
22	(Austria)	Raimund Hedl	24	1						1			
Defenders
2	(Austria)	Thomas Hirsch	20	1						1		1	
4	(Austria)	Günter Schießwald	25	28+2	3	1		6		35+2	3	10	
5	(Austria)	Peter Schöttel	32	33		1		5+1		39+1		13	
8	(Germany)	Martin Braun	30	1						1			
14	(Austria)	Michael Hatz	28	24+1	3			6		30+1	3	7	1
16	(Poland)	Krzysztof Ratajczyk	25	10+2	1					10+2	1	3	
19	(Austria)	Thomas Zingler	28	11+7	2	1		2+2	1	14+9	3	3	1
Midfielders
3	(Germany)	Oliver Freund	29	31	3	1		5+1		37+1	3	9	2
7	(Germany)	Jens Dowe	31	28+4	1	1		6	2	35+4	3	2	
8	(Austria)	Oliver Lederer	21	2+5						2+5		1	1
11	(Greece)	Andreas Lagonikakis	27	30+1	2	1		5+1	1	36+2	3	9	1
12	(Austria)	Jürgen Saler	21	8+10						8+10		4	
13	(Slovakia)	Ottó Szabó	18	5				0+2		5+2			
15	(Austria)	Arnold Wetl	29	23+4		1	1	4+2		28+6	1	1	
18	(Austria)	Andreas Ivanschitz	15	0+1		0+1				0+2			
20	(Austria)	Andreas Heraf	31	8+2		0+1		3		11+3		3	
23	(Austria)	Gerd Wimmer	22	29+4	3			6		35+4	3	7	1
25	(Austria)	Stefan Feitsch	19	0+4		1				1+4			
Forwards
6	(Austria)	Roman Wallner	17	1+6	1	0+1				1+7	1		1
9	(Iran)	Farhad Majidi	23	8+4	2					8+4	2	5	
10	(Federal Republic of Yugoslavia)	Dejan Savicevic	32	19+3	11			1+3	1	20+6	12	9	
17	(Czech Republic)	René Wagner	26	34	17	1		5		40	17	5	
18	(Germany)	Angelo Vier	27	1+2				0+1		1+3		1	
21	(Austria)	Thomas Pichlmann	18	0+2						0+2			
21	(Austria)	Zeljko Radovic	25	8+4	6					8+4	6		
27	(Austria)	Florian Schwarz	22	3+9				1+2		4+11		2	
Players who left after the start of the season
9	(Slovakia)	Marek Penksa	25	14+7	3	1		5+1	1	20+8	4	4	

=== Goal scorers ===
Rank	Name	Bundesliga	Cup	UEFA Competitions	Total
1	(Czech Republic) Rene Wagner	17			17
2	(Federal Republic of Yugoslavia) Dejan Savicevic	11		1	12
3	(Austria) Zeljko Radovic	6			6
4	(Slovakia) Marek Penksa	3		1	4
5	(Germany) Jens Dowe	1		2	3
5	(Germany) Oliver Freund	3			3
5	(Austria) Michael Hatz	3			3
5	(Greece) Andreas Lagonikakis	2		1	3
5	(Austria) Günter Schießwald	3			3
5	(Austria) Gerd Wimmer	3			3
5	(Austria) Thomas Zingler	2		1	3
12	(Iran) Farhad Majidi	2			2
13	(Poland) Krzysztof Ratajczyk	1			1
13	(Austria) Roman Wallner	1			1
13	(Austria) Arnold Wetl		1		1
OG	(Austria) Zoran Barisic (Tirol)	1			1
Totals		59	1	6	66

== Fixtures and results ==
Win Draw Loss

=== Bundesliga ===
Rd	Date	Venue	Opponent	Res.	Att.	Goals and discipline
1	29.06.1999	A	FC Tirol	1-2	12,000	Barisic 9' (o.g.)
2	07.07.1999	H	SW Bregenz	2-0	12,600	Wagner R. 14', Savicevic 86' (pen.)
3	13.07.1999	H	Austria Salzburg	1-0	12,800	Savicevic 49' (pen.)
4	21.07.1999	A	Ried	2-1	8,000	Hatz 32', Penksa 76'
5	17.07.1999	H	Sturm Graz	0-0	14,700	
6	31.07.1999	A	Austria Wien	3-0	16,000	Savicevic 47' 56', Wagner R. 87'
7	07.08.1999	H	Lustenau	2-0	6,400	Freund 69', Wagner R. 82'
8	14.08.1999	A	LASK	1-0	7,000	Schießwald 32'
9	21.08.1999	H	GAK	2-1	7,300	Wagner R. 48', Zingler 88'
10	28.08.1999	A	GAK	1-3	6,950	Schießwald 45'; Freund (yellow card) 60' (red card)
11	11.09.1999	H	FC Tirol	2-4	14,300	Hatz 10', Wagner R. 80'
12	19.09.1999	A	SW Bregenz	1-1	6,500	Savicevic 40'
13	25.09.1999	A	Austria Salzburg	1-1	8,500	Lagonikakis 51'
14	03.10.1999	H	Ried	5-1	5,200	Savicevic 30' 34', Freund 50', Schießwald 61', Wimmer 76'
15	06.10.1999	A	Sturm Graz	0-1	8,000	Lagonikakis (red card) 84'
16	16.10.1999	H	Austria Wien	2-0	16,000	Zingler 19', Wagner R. 85'
17	23.10.1999	A	Lustenau	1-0	4,500	Wagner R. 72'
18	29.10.1999	H	LASK	3-0	6,600	Wagner R. 31' 56' (pen.), Penksa 73'
19	07.11.1999	H	FC Tirol	0-0	14,000	
20	13.11.1999	A	Ried	0-1	8,500	Wimmer (yellow card) 90+3' (red card)
21	19.11.1999	H	Lustenau	4-0	4,600	Wagner R. 27', Savicevic 45' (pen.), Dowe 69', Penksa 75'
22	30.11.1999	A	Sturm Graz	1-3	8,236	Wagner R. 21'
23	02.03.2000	H	Austria Wien	1-0	18,500	Freund 34'
24	12.03.2000	A	SW Bregenz	3-0	6,700	Majidi 39', Wagner R. 68', Radovic 84'
25	17.03.2000	H	Austria Salzburg	5-0	14,000	Savicevic 6' (pen.), Lagonikakis 58', Radovic 80' 88', Hatz 90+2'
26	25.03.2000	A	LASK	1-1	10,000	Wimmer 52'
27	01.04.2000	H	GAK	2-0	11,000	Wagner R. 32', Radovic 53'
28	07.04.2000	A	GAK	4-0	7,328	Wagner R. 15', Radovic 21' 51', Ratajczyk 70'
29	15.04.2000	A	Lustenau	1-0	5,000	Wagner R. 29'
30	22.04.2000	H	Ried	1-0	10,000	Wagner R. 56' (pen.)
31	29.04.2000	A	FC Tirol	0-1	15,500	Lederer (yellow card) 79' (red card)
32	06.05.2000	H	Sturm Graz	2-3	35,700	Savicevic 5' 10'
33	09.05.2000	A	Austria Wien	0-3	10,347	Freund (red card) 19', Hatz (red card) 82'
34	12.05.2000	H	SW Bregenz	4-1	3,000	Majidi 78', Wallner 82', Wimmer 86', Wagner R. 90+3'
35	20.05.2000	A	Austria Salzburg	0-0	3,000	
36	27.05.2000	H	LASK	0-1	5,000	

==== League table ====
Pos	Team	Pld	W	D	L	GF	GA	GD	Pts	Qualification or relegation
1	Tirol Innsbruck (C)	36	24	5	7	54	30	+24	77	Qualification to Champions League third qualifying round
2	Sturm Graz	36	22	8	6	77	32	+45	74	Qualification to Champions League second qualifying round
3	Rapid Wien	36	20	6	10	59	29	+30	66	Qualification to UEFA Cup qualifying round
4	Austria Wien	36	16	6	14	49	44	+5	54	
5	Ried	36	15	8	13	56	39	+17	53	

Source: weltfussball.de (in German)
Rules for classification: 1) points; 2) goal difference; 3) number of goals scored.
(C) Champions

=== Cup ===
Rd	Date	Venue	Opponent	Res.	Att.	Goals and discipline
R1	26.10.1999	A	Ranshofen	1-1 (1-4 p)	2,500	Wetl 21'; Wallner (red card) 77'

=== Champions League qualification ===
Rd	Date	Venue	Opponent	Res.	Att.	Goals and discipline
Q2-L1	28.07.1999	H	Valletta (Malta)	3-0	16,200	Dowe 55', Savicevic 73', Penksa 86'
Q2-L2	04.08.1999	A	Valletta (Malta)	2-0	2,000	Dowe 71', Lagonikakis 89'
Q3-L1	11.08.1999	H	Galatasaray (Turkey)	0-3	30,200	
Q3-L2	25.08.1999	A	Galatasaray (Turkey)	0-1	15,000	Zingler (red card) 90'

=== UEFA Cup ===
Rd	Date	Venue	Opponent	Res.	Att.	Goals and discipline
R1-L1	16.09.1999	A	Inter Bratislava (Slovakia)	0-1	6,600	
R1-L2	30.09.1999	H	Inter Bratislava (Slovakia)	1-2	7,000	Zingler 65'
