= 2001–02 SK Rapid Wien season =

Rapid Wien
2001–02 season
- President: Rudolf Edlinger
- Coach: Ernst Dokupil; Peter Persidis; Lothar Matthäus
- Stadium: Gerhard Hanappi Stadium, Vienna, Austria
- Bundesliga: 8th
- ÖFB-Cup: 3rd round
- UEFA Cup: 2nd round
- Top goalscorer: League: Roman Wallner (15); All: Roman Wallner (18)
- Highest home attendance: 15,200
- Lowest home attendance: 3,500

The 2001–02 SK Rapid Wien season is the 104th season in club history.

== Squad statistics ==
No.	Nat.	Name	Age	League		Cup		UEFA Cup		Total		Discipline	
No.	Nat.	Name	Age	Apps	Goals	Apps	Goals	Apps	Goals	Apps	Goals	Booked	Sent off (straight red)
Goalkeepers
1	(Czech Republic)	Ladislav Maier	35	14				4		18		1	
24	(Austria)	Helge Payer	21	22+1		1		2		25+1		1	
Defenders
2	(Poland)	Marcin Adamski	25	14	2	1				15	2	5	1
4	(Austria)	Günter Schießwald	27	12+2	1			0+3		12+5	1	3	
5	(Austria)	Peter Schöttel	34	4+4				2+1		6+5			
14	(Argentina) (Switzerland)	Ivan Knez	26	15	1	1				16	1	2	
16	(Poland)	Krzysztof Ratajczyk	27	21				6		27		1	1
19	(Austria)	Thomas Zingler	30	14+5	1			3+2		17+7	1	6	
21	(Austria)	Ferdinand Feldhofer	21	12	1	1				13	1	2	
Midfielders
3	(Germany)	Oliver Freund	31	20	1			5		25	1	10	
6	(Austria)	Jürgen Saler	23	16+5	1	1		1+2		18+7	1	3	2
8	(Austria)	Andreas Ivanschitz	17	12+12	1	0+1		3+2		15+15	1	4	
9	(Netherlands)	Gaston Taument	30	24+1	1			6	1	30+1	2	3	1
11	(Greece)	Andreas Lagonikakis	29	17+7	1			6	2	23+7	3	10	2
12	(Austria)	Oliver Lederer	23	5+3				2		7+3		4	
13	(Canada)	Ante Jazic	25	29+2		1		4+1		34+3		5	1
14	(Austria)	Ümit Erbay	20	3+5				1		4+5		3	
15	(Austria)	Salmin Cehajic	17	0+1						0+1			
18	(Austria)	Markus Hiden	23	34+1	2	1		5		40+1	2	3	
20	(Austria)	Jürgen Kauz	26	2+2				1+1		3+3			
22	(Austria)	Andreas Herzog	32	11+1	1	1				12+1	1	2	
23	(Croatia)	Mario Prisc	27	17+8	1	1		4		22+8	1	4	
30	(Germany)	Gerhard Poschner	31	6						6		2	
Forwards
7	(Bosnia and Herzegovina)	Jovica Vico	23	3+3		0+1	1			3+4	1	1	
10	(Austria)	Roman Wallner	19	33+1	15	1		5+1	3	39+2	18	7	1
17	(Czech Republic)	René Wagner	28	12+9	1	1		6	4	19+9	5	5	1
25	(Australia)	Bajo Savic	18	0+3						0+3		1	
26	(Bosnia and Herzegovina)	Darko Maletic	20	7+6				0+5		7+11		3	
27	(Germany)	Thomas Sobotzik	26	17+3	3	0+1				17+4	3	2	
Players who left after the start of the season
12	(Slovakia)	Ottó Szabó	20	0+1						0+1			

=== Goal scorers ===
Rank	Name	Bundesliga	Cup	UEFA Cup	Total
1	(Austria) Roman Wallner	15		3	18
2	(Czech Republic) Rene Wagner	1		4	5
3	(Greece) Andreas Lagonikakis	1		2	3
3	(Germany) Thomas Sobotzik	3			3
5	(Poland) Marcin Adamski	2			2
5	(Austria) Markus Hiden	2			2
5	(Netherlands) Gaston Taument	1		1	2
8	(Austria) Ferdinand Feldhofer	1			1
8	(Germany) Oliver Freund	1			1
8	(Austria) Andreas Herzog	1			1
8	(Austria) Andreas Ivanschitz	1			1
8	(Argentina) (Switzerland) Ivan Knez	1			1
8	(Croatia) Mario Prisc	1			1
8	(Austria) Jürgen Saler	1			1
8	(Austria) Günter Schießwald	1			1
8	(Bosnia and Herzegovina) Jovica Vico		1		1
8	(Austria) Thomas Zingler	1			1
OG	(Austria) Günther Neukirchner (Sturm)	1			1
OG	(Denmark) Lars Winde (Bregenz)	1			1
OG	(Poland) Roman Szewczyk (Salzburg)	1			1
Totals		37	1	10	48

== Fixtures and results ==
Win Draw Loss

=== Bundesliga ===
Rd	Date	Venue	Opponent	Res.	Att.	Goals and discipline
1	11.07.2001	H	Sturm Graz	3-1	11,600	Taument 52', Wallner 57', Neukirchner 65' (o.g.)
2	18.07.2001	A	Ried	2-2	8,500	Freund 15', Saler 57'
3	24.07.2001	A	Austria Klagenfurt	0-3	10,500	
4	28.07.2001	H	SW Bregenz	3-1	6,000	Prisc 30', Wallner 35' 77'
5	31.07.2001	A	Austria Salzburg	1-0	9,000	Hiden Mark. 44'
6	05.08.2001	H	GAK	0-4	8,000	
7	12.08.2001	A	Austria Wien	1-2	10,124	Wallner 47'; Saler (yellow card) 61' (red card) , Ratajczyk (red card) 87'
8	18.08.2001	H	FC Tirol	0-2	9,300	
9	26.08.2001	A	Admira	0-0	8,000	
10	08.09.2001	H	Admira	0-1	5,500	Lagonikakis (red card) 78', Wallner (yellow card) 84' (red card)
11	16.09.2001	A	Sturm Graz	1-1	13,200	Ivanschitz 70'
12	23.09.2001	H	Ried	2-0	5,000	Zingler 85', Wallner 86'; Wagner R. (red card) 54'
13	30.09.2001	H	Austria Klagenfurt	0-1	8,500	
14	10.10.2001	A	SW Bregenz	1-2	7,800	Winde 89' (o.g.)
15	13.10.2001	H	Austria Salzburg	1-0	7,700	Wallner 82'; Taument (red card) 76'
16	21.10.2001	A	GAK	0-1	7,800	
17	06.03.2002	H	Austria Wien	1-1	15,200	Lagonikakis 58'
18	04.11.2001	A	FC Tirol	0-2	14,500	
19	28.11.2001	H	SW Bregenz	2-2	3,500	Wallner 22' 32' (pen.)
20	17.11.2001	A	Ried	0-2	7,500	
21	25.11.2001	H	Austria Wien	1-1	10,400	Wallner 73'
22	01.12.2001	A	FC Tirol	0-1	9,200	
23	24.02.2002	H	Austria Salzburg	1-0	12,200	Szewczyk 20' (o.g.)
24	02.03.2002	A	Admira	1-0	7,000	Adamski 77'
25	09.03.2002	H	Austria Klagenfurt	2-0	8,000	Wallner 62', Knez I. 85'
26	16.03.2002	A	Sturm Graz	0-1	10,342	
27	23.03.2002	H	GAK	1-1	5,200	Feldhofer 60'
28	31.03.2002	A	GAK	2-2	7,500	Sobotzik 26', Hiden Mark. 41'; Lagonikakis (red card) 88'
29	03.04.2002	A	SW Bregenz	0-3	6,000	Jazic (red card) 39'
30	06.04.2002	H	Ried	2-1	4,200	Herzog 25' (pen.), Adamski 55'; Adamski (yellow card) 71' (red card)
31	24.04.2002	A	Austria Wien	1-1	10,300	Wagner R. 9'
32	20.04.2002	H	FC Tirol	0-1	8,800	
33	28.04.2002	A	Austria Salzburg	1-6	4,000	Sobotzik 72'; Saler (yellow card) 66' (red card)
34	01.05.2002	H	Admira	3-2	3,800	Wallner 13' 68' (pen.), Schießwald 65'
35	04.05.2002	A	Austria Klagenfurt	1-1	8,000	Wallner 70'
36	09.05.2002	H	Sturm Graz	3-0	8,000	Wallner 11' 81', Sobotzik 90+1'

==== League table ====
Pos	Team	Pld	W	D	L	GF	GA	GD	Pts	Qualification or relegation
6	Austria Salzburg	36	13	10	13	42	40	+2	49	
7	Bregenz	36	12	9	15	51	70	−19	45	Qualification to Intertoto Cup second round
8	Rapid Wien	36	11	10	15	37	49	−12	43	
9	Ried	36	9	9	18	37	54	−17	36	
10	Admira Wacker Mödling	36	3	6	27	25	81	−56	15	

Source: weltfussball.de (in German)
Rules for classification: 1) points; 2) goal difference; 3) number of goals scored.

=== Cup ===
Rd	Date	Venue	Opponent	Res.	Att.	Goals and discipline
R16	19.03.2002	H	Austria Salzburg	1-2	4,200	Vico 87'

=== UEFA Cup ===
Rd	Date	Venue	Opponent	Res.	Att.	Goals and discipline
Q2-L1	09.08.2001	A	Cosmos (San Marino)	1-0	1,132	Wallner 10'
Q2-L2	23.08.2001	H	Cosmos (San Marino)	2-0	3,300	Lagonikakis 29' 89'
R1-L1	20.09.2001	A	Partizan (Federal Republic of Yugoslavia)	0-1	20,000	
R1-L2	27.09.2001	H	Partizan (Federal Republic of Yugoslavia)	5-1	15,400	Wallner 10' 60', Taument 33', Wagner R. 65' 71'
R2-L1	18.10.2001	A	PSG (France)	0-4	30,000	
R2-L2	01.11.2001	H	PSG (France)	2-2	10,400	Wagner R. 11' 17'
