= 1998–99 SK Rapid Wien season =

Rapid Wien
1998–99 season
- President: Günter Kaltenbrunner
- Coach: Heribert Weber
- Stadium: Gerhard Hanappi Stadium, Vienna, Austria
- Bundesliga: 2nd
- ÖFB-Cup: Semifinals
- UEFA Cup: 1st Round
- Top goalscorer: League: René Wagner (10); All: René Wagner (15)
- Highest home attendance: 15,800
- Lowest home attendance: 4,000

The 1998–99 SK Rapid Wien season is the 101st season in club history.

== Squad statistics ==
No.	Nat.	Name	Age	League		Cup		UEFA Cup		Total		Discipline	
No.	Nat.	Name	Age	Apps	Goals	Apps	Goals	Apps	Goals	Apps	Goals	Booked	Sent off (straight red)
Goalkeepers
1	(Austria)	Raimund Hedl	23			1				1			
21	(Czech Republic)	Ladislav Maier	32	36		4		4		44			
Defenders
5	(Austria)	Peter Schöttel	31	35		3+1		4		42+1		8	
8	(Germany)	Martin Braun	29	23+7	1	3+1		1+1		27+9	1	9	1
14	(Austria)	Michael Hatz	27	14+13		3	1	2+1		19+14	1	11	1
16	(Poland)	Krzysztof Ratajczyk	24	15	2	2	2	4		21	4	2	
19	(Austria)	Thomas Zingler	27	19	2	3	2	4		26	4	6	
Midfielders
3	(Germany)	Oliver Freund	28	33	2	4		3	1	40	3	11	
10	(Federal Republic of Yugoslavia)	Ivan Adzic	25	22	2	3	3			25	5	5	
11	(Austria)	Christian Prosenik	30	33+1	6	4+1	1	4		41+2	7	10	
12	(Austria)	Jürgen Saler	20	7+19	2	2+3		0+4		9+26	2	2	
13	(Austria)	Rene Mitteregger	20	0+1						0+1			
15	(Austria)	Arnold Wetl	28	19+2	2	2		3		24+2	2	3	
20	(Austria)	Andreas Heraf	30	27+2	4	4	1	4	1	35+2	6	8	
23	(Austria)	Gerd Wimmer	21	26+6	2	3+2	1	2+1		31+9	3	4	
33	(Ghana)	Charles Wittl	26	5+4		1+1				6+5			
Forwards
7	(Austria)	Marcus Pürk	23	16+19	7	3+1	2	2+2		21+22	9	1	
9	(Slovakia)	Marek Penksa	24	31+4	4	4+1	1	3		38+5	5	2	
17	(Czech Republic)	René Wagner	25	25+8	10	1+3	2	3+1	3	29+12	15	4	1
18	(Germany)	Angelo Vier	26	10+11	3	5	4	1		16+11	7	2	
27	(Austria)	Florian Schwarz	21	0+2						0+2			

=== Goal scorers ===
Rank	Name	Bundesliga	Cup	UEFA Cup	Total
1	(Czech Republic) Rene Wagner	10	2	3	15
2	(Austria) Marcus Pürk	7	2		9
3	(Austria) Christian Prosenik	6	1		7
3	(Germany) Angelo Vier	3	4		7
5	(Austria) Andreas Heraf	4	1	1	6
6	(Federal Republic of Yugoslavia) Ivan Adzic	2	3		5
6	(Slovakia) Marek Penksa	4	1		5
8	(Poland) Krzysztof Ratajczyk	2	2		4
8	(Austria) Thomas Zingler	2	2		4
10	(Germany) Oliver Freund	2		1	3
10	(Austria) Gerd Wimmer	2	1		3
12	(Austria) Jürgen Saler	2			2
12	(Austria) Arnold Wetl	2			2
14	(Germany) Martin Braun	1			1
14	(Austria) Michael Hatz		1		1
OG	(Senegal) Cheikh Sidy Ba (LASK)	1			1
Totals		50	20	5	75

== Fixtures and results ==
Win Draw Loss

=== Bundesliga ===
Rd	Date	Venue	Opponent	Res.	Att.	Goals and discipline
1	03.11.1998	H	Austria Salzburg	1-0	7,000	Prosenik C. 45' (pen.)
2	02.08.1998	A	GAK	1-1	6,500	Zingler 54'
3	05.08.1998	A	Steyr	2-1	7,000	Wetl 39', Penksa 58'
4	08.08.1998	H	LASK	5-0	7,500	Prosenik C. 27' (pen.), Ratajczyk 63', Penksa 71', Pürk 83', Wagner R. 87'
5	14.08.1998	A	FC Tirol	3-1	7,000	Heraf 21' 90+2', Pürk 67'
6	30.08.1998	H	Sturm Graz	2-0	15,800	Prosenik C. 59' (pen.), Saler 90+3'
7	08.09.1998	A	Austria Wien	1-0	18,000	Wagner R. 63'
8	20.09.1998	H	Ried	1-1	6,400	Heraf 16'
9	23.09.1998	A	Lustenau	0-2	8,800	
10	26.09.1998	H	Lustenau	1-0	5,200	Wagner R. 9'
11	02.10.1998	A	Austria Salzburg	1-1	11,000	Wagner R. 13'; Wagner R. (red card) 74'
12	17.10.1998	H	GAK	0-2	10,000	
13	24.10.1998	H	Steyr	5-1	7,000	Prosenik C. 23' 47' (pen.), Heraf 37', Adzic 44', Vier 68'
14	27.10.1998	A	LASK	0-0	9,000	
15	06.11.1998	H	FC Tirol	1-0	6,000	Zingler 45'
16	11.11.1998	A	Sturm Graz	1-2	11,500	Wagner R. 57'
17	15.11.1998	H	Austria Wien	3-1	11,300	Wagner R. 42', Prosenik C. 64' (pen.), Penksa 77'
18	21.11.1998	A	Ried	1-0	6,000	Wagner R. 65'
19	29.11.1998	A	LASK	3-1	6,000	Ba 22' (o.g.), Wagner R. 41', Freund 55'
20	06.12.1998	H	GAK	1-0	5,400	Pürk 78'
21	06.03.1999	A	FC Tirol	0-0	5,000	
22	13.03.1999	H	Lustenau	2-1	6,000	Ratajczyk 50', Pürk 64'
23	16.03.1999	A	Austria Wien	1-1	11,500	Wagner R. 16'
24	21.03.1999	H	Sturm Graz	2-0	12,000	Wetl 31', Pürk 61'
25	31.03.1999	A	Ried	0-0	5,000	
26	03.04.1999	H	Austria Salzburg	1-1	8,000	Penksa 74'
27	10.04.1999	A	Steyr	3-3	5,000	Braun 7', Vier 9', Wimmer 26'
28	14.04.1999	H	Steyr	2-1	4,000	Pürk 50', Vier 59'
29	17.04.1999	H	LASK	2-0	5,000	Pürk 22', Wagner R. 80'
30	24.04.1999	A	GAK	1-0	8,480	Adzic 8'; Hatz (yellow card) 41' (red card)
31	01.05.1999	H	FC Tirol	1-1	10,000	Freund 18'
32	08.05.1999	A	Lustenau	0-2	7,000	
33	11.05.1999	H	Austria Wien	0-0	14,200	
34	15.05.1999	A	Sturm Graz	1-1	15,400	Wimmer 12'
35	22.05.1999	H	Ried	1-0	10,700	Saler 87'
36	29.05.1999	A	Austria Salzburg	0-0	15,000	

==== League table ====
Pos	Team	Pld	W	D	L	GF	GA	GD	Pts	Qualification or relegation
1	Sturm Graz (C)	36	23	4	9	72	32	+40	73	Qualification to Champions League third qualifying round
2	Rapid Wien	36	19	13	4	50	25	+25	70	Qualification to Champions League second qualifying round
3	Grazer AK	36	20	5	11	46	29	+17	65	Qualification to UEFA Cup qualifying round
4	Austria Salzburg	36	15	12	9	55	40	+15	57	
5	LASK Linz	36	17	6	13	53	44	+9	57	Qualification to UEFA Cup first round

Source: weltfussball.de (in German)
(C) Champions

=== Cup ===
Rd	Date	Venue	Opponent	Res.	Att.	Goals and discipline
R1	22.08.1998	A	Oberndorf	8-0	3,500	Hatz 26', Vier 27' 75', Zingler 35' 38', Pürk 66' 69', Penksa 90'
R2	12.09.1998	A	Mattersburg	5-3	8,200	Vier 8', Prosenik C. 25' (pen.), Heraf 45', Ratajczyk 73' 90'
R16	31.10.1998	H	Wörgl	3-0	3,500	Wagner R. 15', Adzic 26' (pen.), Wimmer 71'
QF	06.04.1999	H	Austria Salzburg	4-1	8,500	Vier 1', Adzic 14' 63', Wagner R. 78'
SF	05.05.1999	H	LASK	0-2	6,000	

=== UEFA Cup ===
Rd	Date	Venue	Opponent	Res.	Att.	Goals and discipline
Q2-L1	11.08.1998	A	Omonia Nicosia (Cyprus)	1-3	12,000	Wagner R. 23'; Braun (yellow card) 37' (red card)
Q2-L2	25.08.1998	H	Omonia Nicosia (Cyprus)	2-0	14,500	Heraf 9', Wagner R. 70'
R1-L1	15.09.1998	A	Girondins Bordeaux (France)	1-1	15,000	Freund 65'
R1-L2	29.09.1998	H	Girondins Bordeaux (France)	1-2	24,500	Wagner R. 42'
