= 2002–03 SK Rapid Wien season =

Rapid Wien
2002–03 season
- President: Rudolf Edlinger
- Coach: Josef Hickersberger
- Stadium: Gerhard Hanappi Stadium, Vienna, Austria
- Bundesliga: 4th
- ÖFB-Cup: 2nd round
- Top goalscorer: League: Roman Wallner (11); All: Roman Wallner (11)
- Highest home attendance: 18,500
- Lowest home attendance: 3,500

The 2002–03 SK Rapid Wien season is the 105th season in club history.

== Squad statistics ==
No.	Nat.	Name	Age	League		Cup		Total		Discipline	
No.	Nat.	Name	Age	Apps	Goals	Apps	Goals	Apps	Goals	Booked	Sent off (straight red)
Goalkeepers
1	(Czech Republic)	Ladislav Maier	36	18				18		2	
24	(Austria)	Helge Payer	22	18		2		20			
Defenders
2	(Poland)	Marcin Adamski	26	28+1	1	2		30+1	1	6	1
3	(Qatar)	Saoud Fath	21	5				5		1	
4	(Austria)	Günter Schießwald	28	8+8	1			8+8	1	3	
12	(Austria)	György Garics	18	1+1				1+1			
13	(Canada)	Ante Jazic	26	32+1		2		34+1		4	1
14	(Switzerland) (Argentina)	Ivan Knez	27	35		2		37		3	
16	(Denmark)	Jacob Laursen	30	8				8		1	
18	(Austria)	Markus Hiden	24	26+4	1	1+1		27+5	1		
21	(Austria)	Ferdinand Feldhofer	22	14+3		1	1	15+3	1	5	
Midfielders
6	(Austria)	Jürgen Saler	24	8+5		2		10+5		2	
7	(Austria)	Andreas Herzog	33	25+4	3	1		26+4	3	8	1
8	(Austria)	Andreas Ivanschitz	18	25+11	5	2		27+11	5	3	
11	(Germany)	Steffen Hofmann	21	24+6	5	0+1		24+7	5	4	
16	(Austria)	Ümit Erbay	21			0+1		0+1			
19	(Austria)	Florian Sturm	20	4+16				4+16			
23	(Croatia)	Mario Prisc	28	31+3	1	1+1		32+4	1	2	
25	(Austria)	Stefan Kulovits	19	13+5	1	2		15+5	1		
27	(Germany)	Thomas Sobotzik	27	16+13	5	0+1		16+14	5	6	
Forwards
9	(Bosnia and Herzegovina)	Jovica Vico	24	1+5				1+5			
10	(Austria)	Roman Wallner	20	31+1	11	2		33+1	11	7	
15	(Qatar)	Adel Jadoua Ali	21	0+3	1	0+1		0+4	1	1	
17	(Czech Republic)	René Wagner	29	20+9	5	2		22+9	5	6	1
26	(Austria)	Roman Kienast	18	5+6				5+6		2	

=== Goal scorers ===
Rank	Name	Bundesliga	Cup	Total
1	(Austria) Roman Wallner	11		11
2	(Germany) Steffen Hofmann	5		5
2	(Austria) Andreas Ivanschitz	5		5
2	(Germany) Thomas Sobotzik	5		5
2	(Czech Republic) Rene Wagner	5		5
6	(Austria) Andreas Herzog	3		3
7	(Poland) Marcin Adamski	1		1
7	(Austria) Ferdinand Feldhofer		1	1
7	(Austria) Markus Hiden	1		1
7	(Qatar) Adel Jadoua Ali	1		1
7	(Austria) Stefan Kulovits	1		1
7	(Croatia) Mario Prisc	1		1
7	(Austria) Günter Schießwald	1		1
Totals		40	1	41

== Fixtures and results ==
Win Draw Loss

=== Bundesliga ===
Rd	Date	Venue	Opponent	Res.	Att.	Goals and discipline
1	10.07.2002	A	Sturm Graz	4-0	7,400	Sobotzik 22', Ivanschitz 72' 78', Schießwald 87'
2	17.07.2002	H	Admira	1-2	9,200	Sobotzik 67'
3	23.07.2002	A	SW Bregenz	1-0	8,500	Wallner 76'
4	31.07.2002	H	Pasching	1-0	10,700	Sobotzik 1'
5	07.08.2002	A	Austria Wien	1-1	11,500	Wallner 85'
6	17.08.2002	H	GAK	1-1	8,100	Wallner 66'
7	24.08.2002	A	Austria Klagenfurt	3-0	8,000	Herzog 48', Wallner 76', Ivanschitz 85'
8	31.08.2002	H	Austria Salzburg	2-2	8,600	Wallner 44' 45'
9	11.09.2002	H	Ried	0-0	6,300	Adamski (red card) 90+2'
10	15.09.2002	A	Ried	1-3	4,500	Wallner 85'
11	22.09.2002	H	Sturm Graz	1-2	7,600	Wallner 60'
12	28.09.2002	A	Admira	0-0	2,500	
13	05.10.2002	H	SW Bregenz	2-1	5,000	Jadoua 86', Sobotzik 90'
14	19.10.2002	A	Pasching	0-2	6,000	
15	27.10.2002	H	Austria Wien	1-2	18,500	Hofmann S. 88'
16	02.11.2002	A	GAK	0-2	7,800	
17	06.11.2002	H	Austria Klagenfurt	2-0	5,800	Wallner 39', Herzog 52'
18	09.11.2002	A	Austria Salzburg	1-3	6,000	Adamski 48'
19	16.11.2002	H	Pasching	2-1	7,200	Herzog 63', Hiden Mark. 64'; Herzog (yellow card) 86' (red card)
20	23.11.2002	A	GAK	0-0	8,650	
21	30.11.2002	A	SW Bregenz	6-3	5,000	Hofmann S. 4' 70', Wagner R. 25' 61' 66', Kulovits 90+2'
22	18.02.2003	H	Admira	0-0	4,800	Jazic (yellow card) 86' (red card) , Wagner R. (red card) 90'
23	01.03.2003	A	Ried	0-0	5,000	
24	09.03.2003	H	Austria Wien	1-1	15,800	Ivanschitz 10'
25	15.03.2003	A	Austria Klagenfurt	0-1	5,000	
26	23.03.2003	H	Sturm Graz	1-0	6,800	Hofmann S. 2'
27	05.04.2003	A	Austria Salzburg	0-2	12,000	
28	12.04.2003	H	Austria Salzburg	0-2	6,400	
29	16.04.2003	A	Pasching	0-3	5,000	
30	23.04.2003	H	GAK	0-0	4,400	
31	26.04.2003	H	SW Bregenz	1-1	4,000	Hofmann S. 43'
32	03.05.2003	A	Admira	1-0	3,500	Wallner 10'
33	10.05.2003	H	Ried	3-2	3,500	Wagner R. 6', Wallner 45', Ivanschitz 51'
34	17.05.2003	A	Austria Wien	0-0	10,780	
35	24.05.2003	H	Austria Klagenfurt	2-1	4,800	Prisc 34', Sobotzik 87' (pen.)
36	29.05.2003	A	Sturm Graz	1-0	5,700	Wagner R. 62'

==== League table ====
Pos	Team	Pld	W	D	L	GF	GA	GD	Pts	Qualification or relegation
2	Grazer AK	36	15	12	9	56	39	+17	57	Qualification to Champions League second qualifying round
3	Austria Salzburg	36	15	11	10	51	46	+5	56	Qualification to UEFA Cup first round
4	Rapid Wien	36	13	12	11	40	38	+2	51	
5	Pasching	36	13	10	13	41	37	+4	49	Qualification to Intertoto Cup first round
6	Sturm Graz	36	14	5	17	50	62	−12	47	

Source: weltfussball.de (in German)
Rules for classification: 1) points; 2) goal difference; 3) number of goals scored.

=== Cup ===
Rd	Date	Venue	Opponent	Res.	Att.	Goals and discipline
R1	27.08.2002	A	Schwanenstadt	1-0	6,000	Feldhofer 76'
R2	25.09.2002	A	Bad Bleiberg	0-2	3,000	
