= 1997–98 SK Rapid Wien season =

Rapid Wien
1997–98 season
- President: Günter Kaltenbrunner
- Coach: Ernst Dokupil; Heribert Weber
- Stadium: Gerhard Hanappi Stadium, Vienna, Austria
- Bundesliga: 2nd
- ÖFB-Cup: Quarterfinals
- UEFA Cup: 3rd round
- Top goalscorer: League: Christian Stumpf (7); Marek Penksa (7); Marcus Pürk (7); All: Christian Stumpf (11)
- Highest home attendance: 13,500
- Lowest home attendance: 5,000

The 1997–98 SK Rapid Wien season is the 100th season in club history.

== Squad statistics ==
No.	Nat.	Name	Age	League		Cup		UEFA Cup		Total		Discipline	
No.	Nat.	Name	Age	Apps	Goals	Apps	Goals	Apps	Goals	Apps	Goals	Booked	Sent off (straight red)
Goalkeepers
1	(Austria)	Raimund Hedl	22	28		2		6		36			
21	(Austria)	Andreas Koch	30	8		1		2		11		2	1
Defenders
4	(Croatia)	Nikola Jerkan	32	20+1		3		5		28+1		5	
5	(Austria)	Peter Schöttel	30	26+2		2		4	1	32+2	1	10	2
12	(Austria)	Martin Hiden	24	20		2		7		29		5	1
14	(Austria)	Michael Hatz	26	3+3		0+1				3+4		1	
16	(Poland)	Krzysztof Ratajczyk	23	29+2	1	1		6		36+2	1	6	1
19	(Austria)	Thomas Zingler	26	9+6		1+1		2+2	1	12+9	1	4	
Midfielders
2	(Austria)	Patrick Jovanovic	23	0+1				0+1		0+2			
3	(Germany)	Oliver Freund	27	29+2		2		5	1	36+2	1	4	2
6	(Austria)	Peter Stöger	31	15	1	2		5+1	3	22+1	4	2	
8	(Germany)	Martin Braun	28	22+10		2	1	5+2		29+12	1	10	
10	(Austria)	Michael Wagner	21	24+7	2	2+1		6		32+8	2	5	1
11	(Austria)	Christian Prosenik	29	16+1	1	2		8	1	26+1	2	5	
13	(Australia)	Pablo Cardozo	24	2+8		0+1				2+9			
14	(Austria)	Theo Grüner	20	6+2		0+1		2+1		8+4		2	
15	(Austria)	Arnold Wetl	27	20+1	3	1+1				21+2	3	1	
20	(Austria)	Andreas Heraf	29	13+5	2			1		14+5	2	5	
22	(Austria)	Marcus Pürk	22	33+2	7	3	1	5		41+2	8	5	1
23	(Austria)	Gerd Wimmer	20	13+5	1	1		4		18+5	1	3	
Forwards
7	(Austria)	Christian Stumpf	30	14+7	7	2	3	5+1	1	21+8	11	4	
9	(Slovakia)	Marek Penksa	23	17+10	7	1+1		3+5	2	21+16	9		
17	(Czech Republic)	René Wagner	24	12+5	3	1		1		14+5	3	5	
18	(Cameroon)	Samuel Ipoua	24	17+1	6	2		6	2	25+1	8	10	2
25	(Austria)	Harry Gartler	32	0+1						0+1			

== Fixtures and results ==
Win Draw Loss

=== Bundesliga ===
Rd	Date	Venue	Opponent	Res.	Att.	Goals and discipline
1	09.07.1997	A	Ried	2-2	7,500	Wagner R. 41', Heraf 85'
2	16.07.1997	H	Admira	0-0	10,500	
3	23.07.1997	H	FC Tirol	1-0	11,000	Ipoua 6'
4	27.07.1997	A	Austria Salzburg	2-5	12,000	Wagner R. 61', Ipoua 78'
5	30.07.1997	H	GAK	1-1	8,500	Ipoua 87'
6	02.08.1997	A	LASK	0-2	7,000	
7	06.08.1997	H	Lustenau	1-0	8,000	Stumpf 43'
8	15.08.1997	A	Austria Wien	3-0	30,000	Stumpf 24', Stöger 40', Penksa 88'
9	23.08.1997	H	Sturm Graz	0-2	13,500	
10	31.08.1997	A	Sturm Graz	0-1	15,000	
11	13.09.1997	H	Ried	3-0	6,000	Stumpf 43' 67', Pürk 59'
12	20.09.1997	A	Admira	2-1	7,500	Ipoua 3' 60'
13	24.09.1997	A	FC Tirol	1-0	7,500	Pürk 12'; Freund (red card) 45'
14	04.10.1997	H	Austria Salzburg	0-3	13,500	
15	18.10.1997	A	GAK	0-3	12,000	
16	25.10.1997	H	LASK	3-1	11,500	Stumpf 33' 53', Ipoua 47'
17	08.11.1997	A	Lustenau	0-0	10,200	Schöttel (red card) 72'
18	16.11.1997	H	Austria Wien	2-0	13,500	Pürk 13', Penksa 80'
19	22.11.1997	A	Ried	2-1	4,000	Wetl 49' 65'
20	30.11.1997	H	GAK	2-0	8,000	Stumpf 28' (pen.), Penksa 86'
21	03.12.1997	A	Admira	1-0	3,500	Prosenik C. 78'
22	01.03.1998	H	Austria Salzburg	0-1	12,000	
23	06.03.1998	A	Austria Wien	1-1	14,000	Wagner M. 63'; Ipoua (red card) 44'
24	10.03.1998	H	Sturm Graz	1-3	5,000	Wagner R. 77'; Wagner M. (red card) 58'
25	14.03.1998	A	Lustenau	1-1	9,500	Wimmer 1'
26	21.03.1998	H	FC Tirol	0-0	5,000	
27	29.03.1998	A	LASK	0-5	18,000	Ratajczyk (yellow card) 70' (red card) , Koch A. (red card) 75'
28	04.04.1998	H	LASK	2-1	7,000	Penksa 77', Pürk 90'
29	11.04.1998	H	Ried	1-0	6,000	Ratajczyk 7'
30	18.04.1998	A	GAK	1-0	9,100	Heraf 69'
31	25.04.1998	H	Admira	2-0	8,000	Wagner M. 38', Wetl 61'
32	29.04.1998	A	Austria Salzburg	0-1	11,000	
33	02.05.1998	H	Austria Wien	0-0	10,000	
34	08.05.1998	A	Sturm Graz	1-0	14,000	Milanic 32' (o.g.)
35	12.05.1998	H	Lustenau	4-1	8,000	Penksa 4' 25' 56', Pürk 85'
36	16.05.1998	A	FC Tirol	2-0	4,000	Pürk 51' 83'

==== League table ====
Pos	Team	Pld	W	D	L	GF	GA	GD	Pts	Qualification or relegation
1	Sturm Graz (C)	36	24	9	3	80	28	+52	81	Qualification to Champions League second qualifying round
2	Rapid Wien	36	18	8	10	42	36	+6	62	Qualification to UEFA Cup second qualifying round
3	Grazer AK	36	18	7	11	53	33	+20	61	Qualification to UEFA Cup second qualifying round
4	Austria Salzburg	36	16	8	12	48	33	+15	56	Qualification to Intertoto Cup second round
5	LASK Linz	36	17	4	15	67	58	+9	55	

Source: weltfussball.de (in German)
(C) Champions

=== Cup ===
Rd	Date	Venue	Opponent	Res.	Att.	Goals and discipline
R3	27.09.1997	A	Prater SV	3-1	2,500	Stumpf 22' 23' 77'
R16	01.11.1997	H	Austria Wien	1-0	12,500	Braun 83'
QF	08.04.1998	H	Admira	1-2	6,000	Pürk 70'

=== UEFA Cup ===
Rd	Date	Venue	Opponent	Res.	Att.	Goals and discipline
Q2-L1	12.08.1997	H	Boby Brno (Czech Republic)	6-1	14,000	Ipoua 36' 62', Stöger 45' 86', Prosenik C. 78', Stumpf 80'
Q2-L2	26.08.1997	A	Boby Brno (Czech Republic)	0-2	3,000	
R1-L1	16.09.1997	H	Hapoel Petah Tikva (Israel)	1-0	10,000	Freund 37'
R1-L2	30.09.1997	A	Hapoel Petah Tikva (Israel)	1-1	6,000	Penksa 70'; Ipoua (red card) 62'
R2-L1	22.10.1997	H	1860 Munich (Germany)	3-0	26,500	Stöger 45' (pen.), Schöttel 64', Penksa 81'; Schöttel (yellow card) 83' (red card)
R2-L2	04.11.1997	A	1860 Munich (Germany)	1-2	25,000	Zingler 70'; Hiden Mart. (red card) 22', Pürk (yellow card) 61' (red card)
R3-L1	25.11.1997	H	Lazio (Italy)	0-2	34,000	Freund (yellow card) 57' (red card)
R3-L2	09.12.1997	A	Lazio (Italy)	0-1	10,000	
