= 2003–04 SK Rapid Wien season =

Rapid Wien
2003–04 season
- President: Rudolf Edlinger
- Coach: Josef Hickersberger
- Stadium: Gerhard Hanappi Stadium, Vienna, Austria
- Bundesliga: 4th
- ÖFB-Cup: Quarterfinals
- Top goalscorer: League: Steffen Hofmann (10); René Wagner (10); All: René Wagner (11)
- Highest home attendance: 18,500
- Lowest home attendance: 8,400

The 2003–04 SK Rapid Wien season is the 106th season in club history.

== Squad statistics ==
No.	Nat.	Name	Age	League		Cup		Total		Discipline	
No.	Nat.	Name	Age	Apps	Goals	Apps	Goals	Apps	Goals	Booked	Sent off (straight red)
Goalkeepers
1	(Czech Republic)	Ladislav Maier	37	9		4		13		1	
24	(Austria)	Helge Payer	23	26				26			
26	(Austria)	Michael Harrauer	19	1+1				1+1			
Defenders
2	(Poland)	Marcin Adamski	27	24+4	1	3+1		27+5	1	3	2
3	(Austria)	Ferdinand Feldhofer	23	21+1		1		22+1		3	1
4	(Austria)	Martin Hiden	30	29		2		31		7	1
12	(Austria)	György Garics	19	22+5		3+1	1	25+6	1	4	
13	(Canada)	Ante Jazic	27	27+3	1	2+2		29+5	1	3	
14	(Austria)	Thomas Burgstaller	23	5+14	2	3		8+14	2	1	
18	(Austria)	Markus Hiden	25	16+2		2		18+2		3	
19	(Austria)	Florian Sturm	21	6+5	1	3+1		9+6	1		
23	(Austria)	Andreas Dober	17	2+3				2+3			
Midfielders
6	(Croatia)	Mario Prisc	29	28		1		29		3	
7	(Iran)	Mehdi Pashazadeh	29	27+1	3	2+1		29+2	3	7	2
8	(Austria)	Andreas Ivanschitz	19	24+1	7	2	1	26+1	8	5	
11	(Germany)	Steffen Hofmann	22	26+1	10	1+1		27+2	10	5	
15	(Austria)	Stefan Kulovits	20	12+7		3		15+7		6	
16	(Austria)	Sebastián Martínez	25	18+15	2	4		22+15	2	6	
22	(Austria)	Salmin Cehajic	19	2+5				2+5		1	
28	(Austria)	Friedrich Breitenfelder	23	1				1		1	1
Forwards
9	(Belgium)	Axel Lawarée	29	14+2	1	1+1	1	15+3	2		
10	(Austria)	Roman Wallner	21	26+6	4	4	2	30+6	6	7	
17	(Czech Republic)	René Wagner	30	26+9	10	1+1	1	27+10	11	5	
20	(Austria)	Roman Kienast	19	2+11		1+1	2	3+12	2	1	
21	(Austria)	René Gartler	17	0+2				0+2			
25	(Bosnia and Herzegovina)	Jovica Vico	25	2+8	5	1		3+8	5		

=== Goal scorers ===
Rank	Name	Bundesliga	Cup	Total
1	(Czech Republic) Rene Wagner	10	1	11
2	(Germany) Steffen Hofmann	10		10
3	(Austria) Andreas Ivanschitz	7	1	8
4	(Austria) Roman Wallner	4	2	6
5	(Bosnia and Herzegovina) Jovica Vico	5		5
6	(Iran) Mehdi Pashazadeh	3		3
7	(Austria) Thomas Burgstaller	2		2
7	(Austria) Roman Kienast		2	2
7	(Belgium) Axel Lawaree	1	1	2
7	(Austria) Sebastian Martinez	2		2
11	(Poland) Marcin Adamski	1		1
11	(Austria) György Garics		1	1
11	(Canada) Ante Jazic	1		1
11	(Austria) Florian Sturm	1		1
OG	(Netherlands) Frank Verlaat (Austria)	1		1
OG	(Austria) Michael Baur (Pasching)	1		1
OG	(Tajikistan) Sergei Mandreko (Mattersburg)	1		1
Totals		50	8	58

== Fixtures and results ==
Win Draw Loss

=== Bundesliga ===
Rd	Date	Venue	Opponent	Res.	Att.	Goals and discipline
1	16.07.2003	H	Pasching	4–2	9,400	Wagner R. 14', Pashazadeh 30', Hofmann S. 52', Vico 73'
2	13.07.2003	A	Austria Salzburg	2–1	13,000	Wagner R. 19', Adamski 47'; Pashazadeh (yellow card) 54' (red card)
3	30.07.2003	H	Admira	1–0	11,800	Wagner R. 33'
4	07.08.2003	A	Sturm Graz	2–0	8,643	Ivanschitz 57', Hofmann S. 58'
5	17.08.2003	H	Austria Wien	2–2	18,500	Verlaat 23' (o.g.), Vico 57'
6	24.08.2003	A	Mattersburg	4–1	17,000	Wagner R. 22' 59', Ivanschitz 31', Hofmann S. 57'
7	31.08.2003	H	Austria Klagenfurt	2–2	14,200	Hofmann S. 45' (pen.), Vico 90+3'; Pashazadeh (yellow card) 68' (red card)
8	17.09.2003	A	SW Bregenz	2–1	9,100	Hofmann S. 10', Wallner 55'
9	14.09.2003	H	GAK	2–1	15,300	Vico 50', Ivanschitz 59'
10	21.09.2003	A	GAK	0–2	9,100	Feldhofer (red card) 39'
11	28.09.2003	A	Pasching	2–1	5,500	Hofmann S. 12' (pen.), Baur 32' (o.g.)
12	04.10.2003	H	Austria Salzburg	1–0	13,800	Ivanschitz 90'
13	18.10.2003	A	Admira	2–4	10,200	Wagner R. 67' (pen.) 80'; Adamski (yellow card) 36' (red card)
14	26.10.2003	H	Sturm Graz	2–0	15,300	Wagner R. 20', Ivanschitz 73'
15	29.10.2003	A	Austria Wien	0–2	11,800	
16	01.11.2003	H	Mattersburg	3–1	14,700	Hofmann S. 53' (pen.), Burgstaller T. 65', Pashazadeh 87'; Adamski (red card) 36'
17	09.11.2003	A	Austria Klagenfurt	0–2	4,500	
18	22.11.2003	H	SW Bregenz	2–2	13,000	Wallner 41', Hofmann S. 83'
19	29.11.2003	A	Mattersburg	1–1	14,600	Mandreko 72' (o.g.); Hiden Mart. (yellow card) 68' (red card)
20	07.12.2003	H	Sturm Graz	1–1	12,000	Ivanschitz 58'
21	22.02.2004	A	SW Bregenz	1–1	5,000	Hofmann S. 45+1'
22	05.05.2004	H	Austria Klagenfurt	3–2	8,400	Sturm F. 44', Wallner 57', Hofmann S. 80'
23	07.03.2004	A	Austria Wien	1–1	11,500	Jazic 68'
24	13.03.2004	H	Pasching	0–0	9,700	
25	17.03.2004	A	Admira	0–1	5,100	
26	20.03.2004	H	Austria Salzburg	2–0	9,400	Martínez 20', Wallner 90'
27	27.03.2004	A	GAK	1–2	11,273	Martínez 77'
28	03.04.2004	H	GAK	0–4	15,200	
29	07.04.2004	H	Mattersburg	2–0	11,000	Wagner R. 80', Ivanschitz 90'
30	14.04.2004	A	Sturm Graz	2–1	7,224	Pashazadeh 34', Lawarée 88'
31	17.04.2004	H	SW Bregenz	0–0	8,700	
32	24.04.2004	A	Austria Klagenfurt	1–0	6,000	Wagner R. 86'
33	02.05.2004	H	Austria Wien	1–2	18,000	Vico 77'
34	08.05.2004	A	Pasching	0–2	7,150	
35	15.05.2004	H	Admira	1–3	9,700	Burgstaller T. 80'
36	20.05.2004	A	Austria Salzburg	0–2	14,785	Breitenfelder (yellow card) 78' (red card)

==== League table ====
Pos	Team	Pld	W	D	L	GF	GA	GD	Pts	Qualification or relegation
2	Austria Wien	36	21	8	7	63	31	+32	71	Qualification to UEFA Cup second qualifying round
3	Pasching	36	17	12	7	59	41	+18	63	Qualification to UEFA Cup second qualifying round
4	Rapid Wien	36	16	9	11	50	47	+3	57	Qualification to UEFA Cup second qualifying round
5	Bregenz	36	11	12	13	47	58	−11	45	Qualification to Intertoto Cup second round
6	Admira Wacker Mödling	36	11	9	16	42	49	−7	42	

Source: weltfussball.de (in German)
Rules for classification: 1) points; 2) goal difference; 3) number of goals scored.

=== Cup ===
Rd	Date	Venue	Opponent	Res.	Att.	Goals and discipline
R1	27.08.2003	A	Admira II	3–0	1,000	Wallner 20', Garics 31', Kienast R. 60'
R2	24.09.2003	A	Kremser SC	3–2	6,000	Wallner 10', Kienast R. 20', Ivanschitz 57'
R16	10.04.2004	A	Arnfels	1–0	5,000	Wagner R. 85'
QF	21.04.2004	H	GAK	1–3	9,200	Lawarée 17'
