= Andreas Ivanschitz =

Austrian footballer (born 1983)

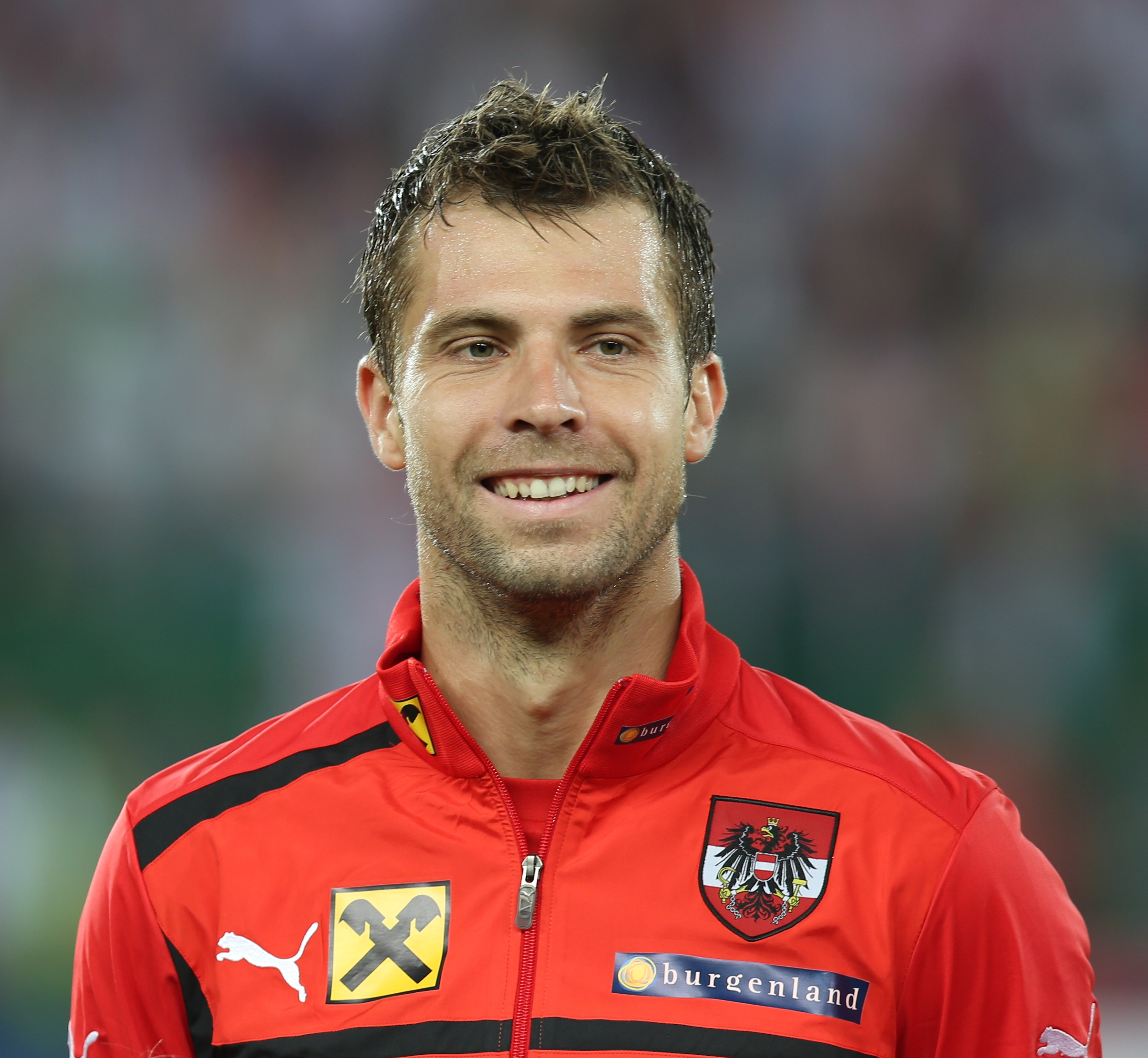
- Ivanschitz with Austria in 2012

Personal information
- Full name: Andreas Franz Ivanschitz
- Date of birth: 15 October 1983 (age 43)
- Place of birth: Eisenstadt, Austria
- Height: 1.83 m (6 ft 0 in)
- Position: Attacking midfielder

Youth career
- 1989–1998: ASK Baumgarten
- 1998–2000: Rapid Wien

Senior career*
Years	Team	Apps	(Gls)
2000–2005	Rapid Wien	147	(25)
2006	Red Bull Salzburg	13	(1)
2006–2011	Panathinaikos	67	(10)
2009–2011	→ Mainz 05 (loan)	47	(9)
2011–2013	Mainz 05	57	(13)
2013–2015	Levante	49	(4)
2015–2016	Seattle Sounders FC	34	(4)
2017–2018	Viktoria Plzeň	13	(3)
Total		427	(69)

International career
	Austria U16	10	(0)
	Austria U17	7	(1)
	Austria U18	5	(1)
2001–2003	Austria U21	10	(1)
2003–2014	Austria	69	(12)
- * Club domestic league appearances and goals

Andreas Franz Ivanschitz (Croatian: Andrej Ivančić; born 15 October 1983) is an Austrian former footballer who played as an attacking midfielder.

During his 18-year career as a player, Ivanschitz played for Rapid Wien, Red Bull Salzburg, Panathinaikos, 1.FSV Mainz 05, Levante, Seattle Sounders FC and Viktoria Plzen.

A full international since 2003, he represented Austria at Euro 2008.

== Club career ==
Born in Eisenstadt, Ivanschitz began his football career as a youth in his town's local team called ASK Baumgarten, where he spent nine years. Soon, Rapid Wien scouts found out about his talent and in 1998, he signed his first professional contract with the Austrian champions. He was only 16 years old when he wore his team's shirt during an Austrian Cup match against Ranshofen on 26 October 1999. His first official League match was in 2000 against Wüstenrot Salzburg. In 177 games for Rapid Wien, Ivanschitz scored 27 times, winning the Austrian Championship title in 2004–05. In 2003, he was elected "Austrian Footballer of the Year."

In January 2006, Ivanschitz transferred to Red Bull Salzburg and then to Greek Super League club Panathinaikos in August 2006 on a two-year loan. On 20 June 2008, Ivanschitz agreed on a permanent deal with Panathinaikos.

After three years in Greece with Panathinaikos he agreed on 18 July 2009 on a two-year loan with Mainz 05 with the view to a two-year permanent contract in the summer of 2011. Mainz took advantage of this contract option prematurely, and signed Ivanschitz permanently in January 2011.

On 10 June 2013, Ivanschitz left Mainz for Levante. He scored his first goal in La Liga on 31 August, the winner with the last kick of a 2–1 home win over Rayo Vallecano. He finished his first season in Spain with three goals from 29 games, the last being in a 2–0 win over city rivals Valencia on 10 May.

On 4 August 2015, he signed with Seattle Sounders FC in Major League Soccer. After suffering from an injury his debut was postponed to 13 September where he assisted a late Obafemi Martins goal to tie up the game against San Jose Earthquakes. Ivanschitz converted Seattle's second kick from the spot in the 2016 MLS Cup penalty shootout, which the Sounders eventually won after six rounds, securing their first MLS Cup Title.

== International career ==
Ivanschitz made his debut for Austria in a February 2003 friendly match against Greece, coming on as a substitute for Markus Weissenberger. He was also a participant at the UEFA Euro 2008. He has earned 69 caps for Austria and has scored 12 goals.

== Personal life ==
Ivanschitz comes from a musical family and plays various musical instruments in his spare time. He is a part of the Burgenland Croat community. Ivanschitz's son Ilia, is also a footballer who currently plays for Red Bull Salzburg.

== Career statistics ==
=== Club ===
Appearances and goals by club, season and competition
Club	Season	League			Cup		Continental		Other (Note: Includes Super League playoffs and MLS Cup playoffs.)		Total		Ref.
Club	Season	League	Apps	Goals	Apps	Goals	Apps	Goals	Apps	Goals	Apps	Goals	Ref.
Rapid Wien	1999–2000	Austrian Bundesliga	1	0	0	0	0	0	—		1	0	
Rapid Wien	2000–01	Austrian Bundesliga	14	2	2	0	2	0	—		8	2	
Rapid Wien	2001–02	Austrian Bundesliga	24	1	1	0	5	0	—		30	1	
Rapid Wien	2002–03	Austrian Bundesliga	36	5	0	0	—		—		36	5	
Rapid Wien	2003–04	Austrian Bundesliga	25	7	2	1	—		—		27	8	
Rapid Wien	2004–05	Austrian Bundesliga	29	5	3	1	4	0	—		36	6	
Rapid Wien	2005–06	Austrian Bundesliga	18	5	0	0	8	0	—		26	5	
Rapid Wien	Total		147	25	8	2	19	0	0	0	174	27	—
Red Bull Salzburg	2005–06	Austrian Bundesliga	12	1	0	0	—		—		12	1	
Red Bull Salzburg	2006–07	Austrian Bundesliga	1	0	0	0	0	0	—		1	0	
Red Bull Salzburg	Total		13	1	0	0	0	0	0	0	13	1	—
Panathinaikos	2006–07	Super League	0	0	1	0	7	0	—		8	0	
Panathinaikos	2007–08	Super League	24	3	0	0	5	0	3	2	32	5	
Panathinaikos	2008–09	Super League	17	3	0	0	6	1	1	0	24	4	
Panathinaikos	Total		41	6	1	0	18	1	4	2	64	9	—
Mainz 05 (loan)	2009–10	Bundesliga	27	6	1	0	—		—		28	6	
Mainz 05 (loan)	2010–11	Bundesliga	20	3	2	0	—		—		22	3	
Mainz 05 (loan)	Total		47	9	3	0	0	0	0	0	50	9	—
Mainz 05	2011–12	Bundesliga	26	6	1	1	2	0	—		29	7	
Mainz 05	2012–13	Bundesliga	31	7	3	1	—		—		34	8	
Mainz 05	Total		57	13	4	2	2	0	0	0	63	15	—
Levante	2013–14	La Liga	29	3	2	1	—		—		31	4	
Levante	2014–15	La Liga	20	1	0	0	—		—		20	1	
Levante	Total		49	4	2	1	—		0	0	51	5	—
Seattle Sounders FC	2015	Major League Soccer	6	1	0	0	0	0	3	1	9	2	
Seattle Sounders FC	2016	Major League Soccer	28	3	0	0	0	0	3	0	31	3	
Seattle Sounders FC	Total		34	4	0	0	0	0	6	1	40	5	
Career total			360	59	18	5	39	1	10	3	427	68	—

=== International ===
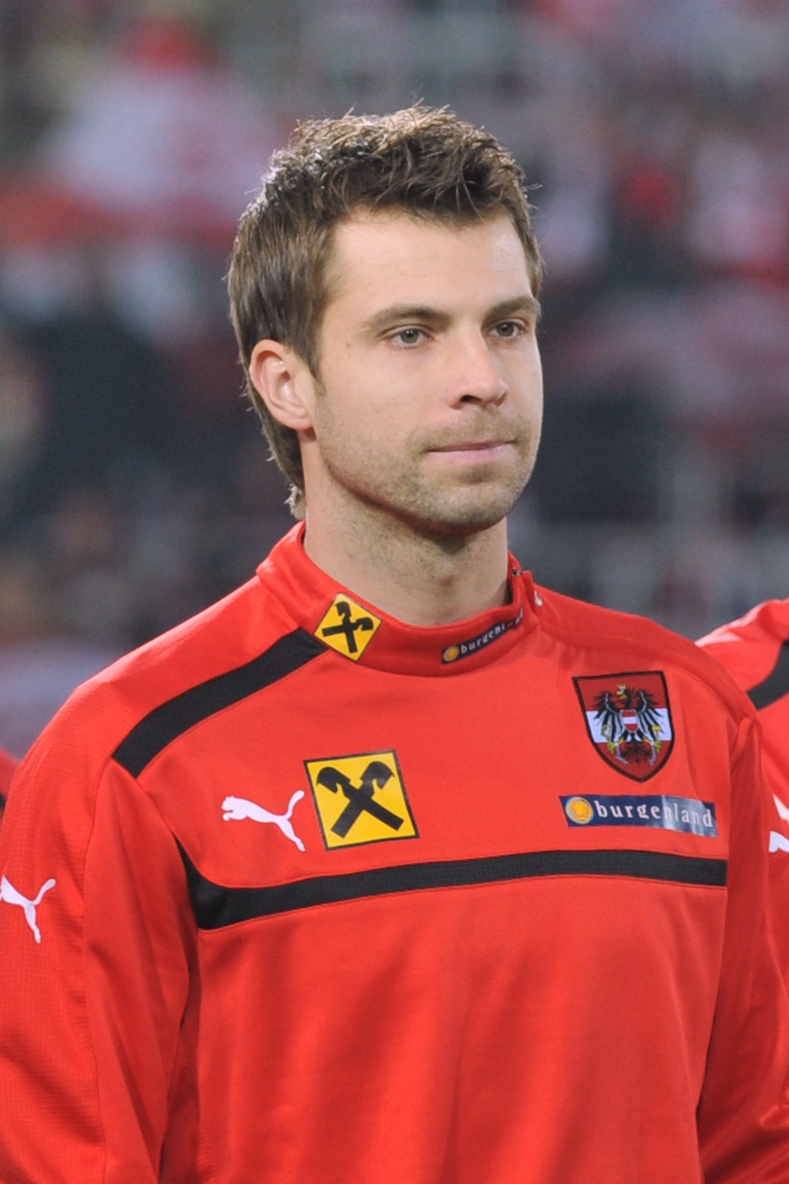
Ivanschitz before Austria's friendly match against Ivory Coast in November 2012

Appearances and goals by national team and year
National team	Year	Apps	Goals
Austria	2003	4	1
Austria	2004	6	1
Austria	2005	8	0
Austria	2006	8	1
Austria	2007	9	2
Austria	2008	13	2
Austria	2009	1	0
Austria	2011	3	1
Austria	2012	7	2
Austria	2013	7	2
Austria	2014	3	0
Total		69	12

Scores and results list Austria's goal tally first, score column indicates score after each Ivanschitz goal.

List of international goals scored by Andreas Ivanschitz
No.	Date	Venue	Opponent	Score	Result	Competition
1	11 October 2003	Ernst-Happel-Stadion, Vienna, Austria	Czech Republic	2–1	2–3	UEFA Euro 2004 qualifying
2	4 September 2004	Ernst-Happel-Stadion, Vienna, Austria	England	2–2	2–2	2006 FIFA World Cup qualification
3	23 May 2006	Ernst-Happel-Stadion, Vienna, Austria	Croatia	1–1	1–4	Friendly
4	7 February 2007	Ta' Qali National Stadium, Ta' Qali, Malta	Malta	1–1	1–1	Friendly
5	17 October 2007	Tivoli-Neu, Innsbruck, Austria	Ivory Coast	2–1	3–2	Friendly
6	26 March 2008	Ernst-Happel-Stadion, Vienna, Austria	Netherlands	1–0	3–4	Friendly
7	6 September 2008	Ernst-Happel-Stadion, Vienna, Austria	France	3–1	3–1	2010 FIFA World Cup qualification
8	7 October 2011	Dalga Stadium, Baku, Azerbaijan	Azerbaijan	1–0	4–1	UEFA Euro 2012 qualifying
9	29 February 2012	Wörtherseestadion, Klagenfurt, Austria	Finland	3–0	3–1	Friendly
10	15 August 2012	Ernst-Happel-Stadion, Vienna, Austria	Turkey	2–0	2–0	Friendly
11	22 March 2013	Ernst-Happel-Stadion, Vienna, Austria	Faroe Islands	3–0	6–0	2014 FIFA World Cup qualification
12	15 October 2013	Tórsvøllur, Tórshavn, Faroe Islands	Faroe Islands	1–0	3–0	2014 FIFA World Cup qualification

== Honours ==
Rapid Wien

- Austrian Football Bundesliga: 2005

Seattle Sounders FC

- MLS Cup: 2016

Individual

- Austrian Footballer of the Year: 2003
