= Samuel Ipoua =

Cameroonian footballer (born 1973)

Personal information
- Full name: Samuel Ipoua Hamben
- Date of birth: 1 March 1973 (age 53)
- Place of birth: Douala, Cameroon
- Height: 1.83 m (6 ft 0 in)
- Position: Striker

Senior career*
Years	Team	Apps	(Gls)
1992–1996	Nice	72	(18)
1996	Torino	9	(0)
1997–1998	Rapid Wien	25	(6)
1998–2000	Toulouse	36	(9)
2000–2001	Mainz 05	5	(1)
2001–2002	1860 Munich	5	(0)
2002–2004	LR Ahlen	9	(2)
2004–2005	Sint-Truiden	22	(3)
2005–2006	FC Wiltz 71	13	(1)
Total		196	(40)

International career
1997–1998	Cameroon	9	(0)
- * Club domestic league appearances and goals

Samuel Ipoua Hamben (born 1 March 1973) is a Cameroonian former professional footballer who played as a striker.

He played for several European clubs, including Nice (France), Torino (Italy), Rapid Wien (Austria), Toulouse (France), Mainz 05, 1860 Munich and LR Ahlen in Germany. At the local level, he played for Union de Douala (Cameroon).

He played for the Cameroon national football team and played in two of their three group stage matches at the 1998 FIFA World Cup. Ipoua was also a member of the Cameroon squad for the 1998 African Cup of Nations, featuring in two matches, including their quarter-final defeat to DR Congo.

His brother Guy Ipoua was also a footballer and spent most of his career playing in England.

In 2001 he went on trial at Everton, starting in a friendly against Yeovil Town but was not signed by the club. In July 2005, he also had a failed trial with Grimsby Town.

After his playing career Ipoua worked with the French blind football national team and managed at Toulouse Rodéo FC.

== Personal life ==
Samuel Ipoua holds Cameroonian and French nationalities.
