= Andreas Koch =

Austrian footballer

Personal information
- Date of birth: 11 September 1966 (age 60)
- Position: Goalkeeper

Senior career*
Years	Team	Apps	(Gls)
1989–1990	Rapid Wien	2	(0)
1990–1993	Vienna		
1993–1994	Vfb Mödling		
1994–1995	FC Tirol Innsbruck		
1995	Grazer AK		
1996–1997	Vienna		
1997–1998	Rapid Wien	8	(0)
- * Club domestic league appearances and goals

Andreas Koch (born 11 September 1966) is an Austrian former footballer.
