= Gaston Taument =

Dutch footballer (born 1970)

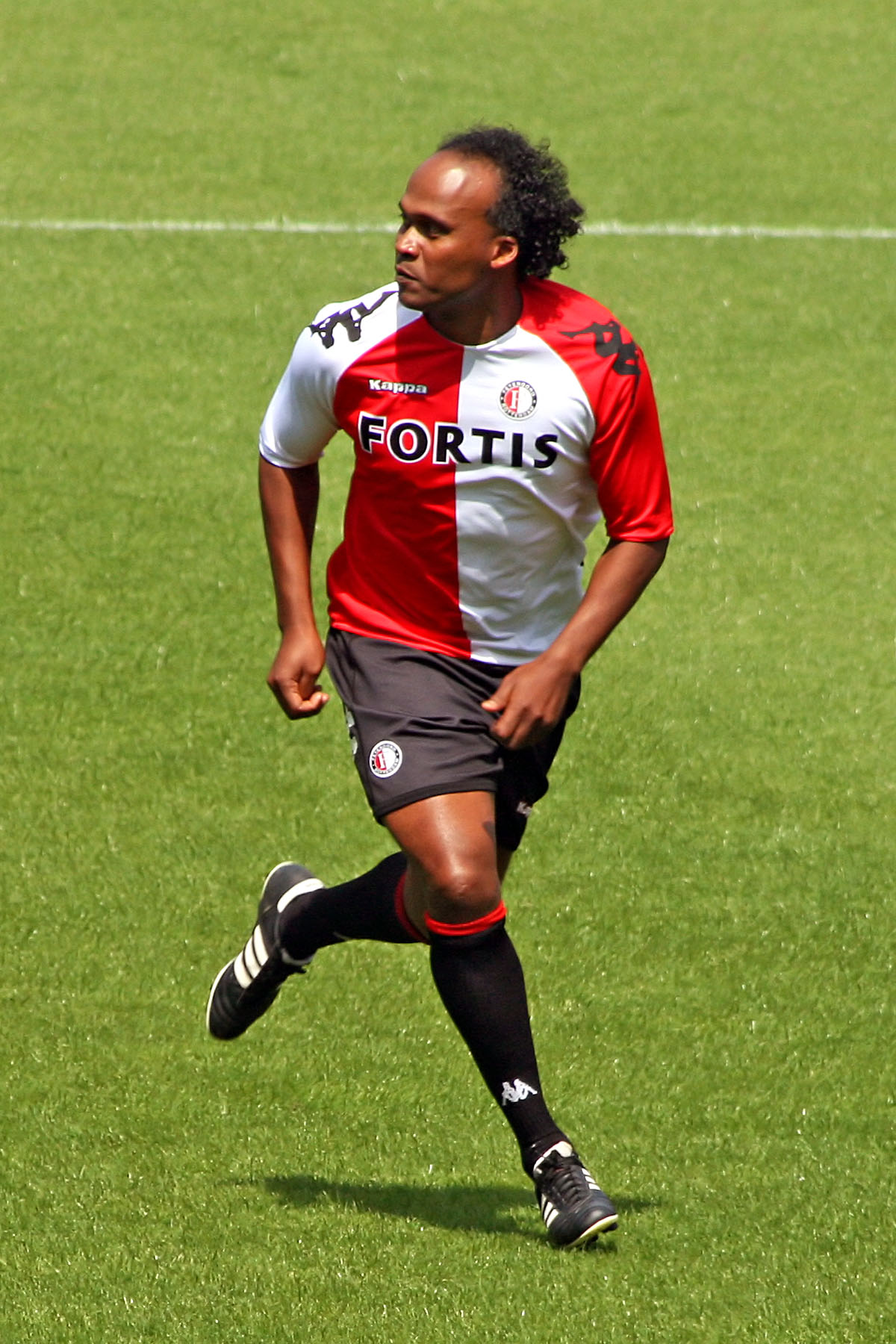
- Taument in action for 'old' Feyenoord

Personal information
- Date of birth: 1 October 1970 (age 56)
- Place of birth: The Hague, Netherlands
- Height: 1.78 m (5 ft 10 in)
- Position: Winger

Youth career
- VCS Den Haag
- BTC Den Haag
- Feyenoord

Senior career*
| Years | Team | Apps | (Gls) |
| 1988–1997 | Feyenoord | 204 | (45) |
| 1989–1990 | → Excelsior (loan) | 25 | (1) |
| 1997 | Benfica | 16 | (0) |
| 1998–1999 | Anderlecht | 11 | (1) |
| 1999–2000 | OFI | 15 | (0) |
| 2000–2002 | Rapid Wien | 61 | (4) |
| Total | | 332 | (51) |

International career
| 1992–1996 | Netherlands | 15 | (2) |
- * Club domestic league appearances and goals

Gaston Taument (born 1 October 1970) is a Dutch former professional footballer who played mainly as a right winger but also as a second striker.

He played the vast majority of his 14-year professional career with Feyenoord, amassing Eredivisie totals of 204 games and 45 goals over the course of nine seasons.

A Netherlands international in the 1990s, Taument represented the nation at the 1994 World Cup and Euro 1996.

== Club career ==
Born in The Hague, South Holland, Taument was a product of Feyenoord's youth system. He played one first-team match in 1988–89 and another in the following season before joining second division side Excelsior on loan, also in the city. During seven full seasons at De Kuip, he formed an efficient winger partnership with Regi Blinker (from 1991 to 1995, the pair combined for 61 Eredivisie goals).

In July 1997, after nearly 300 official games with Feyenoord, Taument signed with Portugal's Benfica, but failed to establish himself at the club, scoring just once in a Taça de Portugal tie against Rio Ave. He moved in the next transfer window to Anderlecht, also being rarely played during his tenure.

After spending the 1999–2000 campaign in Greece with OFI, Taument was first-choice during his spell in the Austrian Bundesliga with Rapid Wien, helping them finish second in his first year. He retired in June 2002 at the age of 31, and was named Dutch Football Talent of the Year in 1991.

== International career ==
Taument earned 15 caps for the Netherlands, scoring twice. He was a member of the squad at the 1994 FIFA World Cup – where he scored the winning goal in their first game against Saudi Arabia (2–1)– and at UEFA Euro 1996.

Taument made his international debut on 12 February 1992, in a friendly with Portugal played in the Estádio de São Luís, in Faro (0–2 loss).

== Coaching career ==
After retiring, Taument began working as a youth coach for Feyenoord. As of 2022, he coaches the under-14 team.

== Honours ==
Feyenoord

- Eredivisie: 1992–93
- KNVB Cup: 1990–91, 1991–92, 1993–94, 1994–95
- Dutch Supercup: 1991

Individual

- Dutch Football Talent of the Year: 1991
