= Jens Dowe =

German footballer (born 1968)

Personal information
- Date of birth: 1 June 1968 (age 58)
- Place of birth: Rostock, East Germany
- Height: 1.82 m (6 ft 0 in)
- Position: Attacking midfielder

Team information
- Current team: SV Waren 09 (Manager and sporting director)

Youth career
- Hansa Rostock

Senior career*
Years	Team	Apps	(Gls)
1986–1987	Hansa Rostock	1	(0)
1987–1988	Hansa Rostock II	21	(2)
1988–1989	BSG KKW Greifswald	45	(6)
1989–1994	Hansa Rostock	145	(22)
1994–1996	1860 Munich	51	(4)
1996	Hamburger SV	4	(0)
1996–1997	Wolverhampton Wanderers (loan)	8	(0)
1997	Sturm Graz	18	(3)
1997–1999	Hansa Rostock	51	(8)
1999–2001	Rapid Vienna	60	(7)
2001–2002	SV Babelsberg 03	19	(3)
2002–2004	Holstein Kiel	63	(3)
2004	SV Warnemünde		
2004	SV Wilhelmshaven	4	(0)
2005	TSG Neustrelitz	23	(1)

Managerial career
- 2006: Greifswalder SV
- 2008–2009: Hansa Rostock (U-17 assistant coach)
- 2009: Hansa Rostock II (assistant coach)
- 2009–2010: Hansa Rostock (youth)
- 2010–2011: Hansa Rostock
- 2012: Güstrower SC
- 2012–2013: SV Waren 09
- 2013–2014: Hansa Rostock (youth)
- 2014: FCM Schwerin (scout)
- 2014–: SV Waren 09 (sportsdirector)
- 2014–: SV Waren 09
- * Club domestic league appearances and goals

Jens Dowe (born 1 June 1968) is a German former professional footballer who played as an attacking midfielder He later worked as a manager and as a sports director.

== Career ==
Born in Rostock, Dowe had three different spells as a player with his hometown club Hansa Rostock, with whom he won the final staging of the DDR-Oberliga (East German Premier League) in 1991.

He also played in the Bundesliga for TSV 1860 Munich and Hamburg. Dowe spent spells abroad in the English First Division with Wolverhampton Wanderers, and in Austria, with Sturm Graz.

He moved into coaching after retiring from playing in 2005.

== Honours ==
Hansa Rostock

- DDR-Oberliga: 1990–91
- FDGB-Pokal: 1990–91

Sturm Graz

- Austrian Cup: 1996–97
