= Jürgen Kauz =

Austrian footballer

Personal information
- Date of birth: 23 August 1974 (age 52)
- Place of birth: Wien, Austria
- Height: 1.72 m (5 ft 7 1/2 in)
- Position: Midfielder

Youth career
- FK Austria Wien

Senior career*
Years	Team	Apps	(Gls)
1991-1995	FK Austria Wien		
1995–2000	LASK Linz		
2000–2002	SK Rapid Wien		
2002	SV Ried		
2003	SV Pasching		
2003	SC Rheindorf Altach		
2004	SC Schwarz-Weiß Bregenz		
2005	Rot-Weiß Rankweil		
2006	SC Bregenz		
2006–2008	SV Donau		
2008–2009	FC Mäder		

International career
1993–1995	Austria U21	7	(2)
1999	Austria	2	(0)
- * Club domestic league appearances and goals as of 03:59, 15 December 2008 (UTC)

Jürgen Kauz (born 23 August 1974) is an Austrian football player.
