= Zeljko Radovic =

Austrian footballer

Personal information
- Date of birth: 6 April 1974 (age 52)
- Place of birth: Vienna, Austria
- Height: 1.91 m (6 ft 3 in)
- Position: Striker

Youth career
- Red Star Wien
- –1993: First Vienna
- 1993: SR Donaufeld
- 1993–1994: First Vienna

Senior career*
Years	Team	Apps	(Gls)
1994–1997	First Vienna	59	(16)
1997–1998	Grazer AK	71	(19)
1999–2000	Rapid Wien	42	(11)
2000–2003	SV Ried	56	(13)
2003–2004	Arminia Bielefeld	22	(3)
2004	Arminia Bielefeld II	7	(0)
2005–2007	Kapfenberger SV	71	(15)
2007–2009	SV Wienerberg	38	(11)
2009–2010	IC Favoriten	30	(24)
2010–2011	Landstraßer AC	15	(16)
2011	Team Wiener Linien	17	(11)
2011	SC Leopoldsdorf/Wien	0	(0)

International career
2000	Austria	1	(0)

Managerial career
- 2011–2013: Rapid Wien (U16)
- 2013–2019: Rapid Wien (U18)
- 2019–2020: Rapid Wien II
- * Club domestic league appearances and goals

Zeljko Radovic (born 6 April 1974 in Vienna) is an Austrian retired football player.

== International career ==
Radovic is former member of the Austria national football team and earned his only cap in 2000 in the qualification to the FIFA World Cup 2002.

== Coaching career ==
Radovic ended his career in 2011. From 2011 to March 2019 he worked as a youth coach at SK Rapid Vienna. In March 2019 he took over the Rapid's reserve team, which played in the Regionalliga Ost. He led the team to promotion to the 2nd division in 2020. Shortly before the start of the 2020/21 season, he terminated his contract with Rapid in September 2020.
