= Angelo Vier =

German footballer (born 1972)

Personal information
- Date of birth: 23 April 1972 (age 54)
- Place of birth: East Berlin, East Germany
- Height: 1.91 m (6 ft 3 in)
- Position: Striker

Youth career
- BFC Dynamo

Senior career*
Years	Team	Apps	(Gls)
1989–1991	Stahl Brandenburg	0	(0)
1991–1992	Gueugnon	36	(6)
1993	SAS Épinal	14	(2)
1993–1995	SC Verl	46	(23)
1995	Werder Bremen	11	(1)
1996	Arminia Bielefeld	11	(0)
1996–1997	Rot-Weiss Essen	33	(18)
1997–1998	FC Gütersloh	33	(18)
1998–1999	Rapid Wien	24	(3)
2000–2002	Rot-Weiß Oberhausen	70	(22)
2002–2003	VfL Osnabrück	41	(7)
2004–2006	SC Verl	22	(11)
Total		341	(111)
- * Club domestic league appearances and goals

Angelo Vier (born 23 April 1972) is a German former professional footballer who played as a striker. He is the sporting director of BFC Dynamo.

== Playing career ==
Angelo Vier was born in East Berlin in 1972. During his youth, he played for the youth teams of BFC Dynamo and received training in the Sportforum Hohenschönhausen.

Vier spent one season in the Bundesliga with Werder Bremen.

== Post-playing career ==
Following his retirement Vier worked as a player agent.

Vier was announced as the new sporting director of BFC Dynamo in May 2015. The coach of BFC Dynamo at the time was Thomas Stratos. Vier and Stratos had played together at Arminia Bielefeld. Vier left BFC Dynamo in August 2017 to become the new sporting director of FC Ingolstadt 04, succeeding Thomas Linke. He signed a two-year contract with the 2. Bundesliga club.

Vier eventually returned to BFC Dynamo in September 2022. Vier would serve as sports director at BFC Dynamo for three seasons. In January 2025, BFC Dynamo eventually announced that Vier will not be extending his contract, which expires in the summer of 2025, for "professional reasons". Vier will be succeeded at BFC Dynamo by Enis Alushi. According to the club, Vier and Alushi will work together during the second half of the 2024–25, to achieve "a seamless transition".

== Honours ==
- 2. Bundesliga top scorer: 1997 with Rot-Weiss Essen, 1998 with FC Gütersloh
