= Markus Hiden =

Austrian footballer

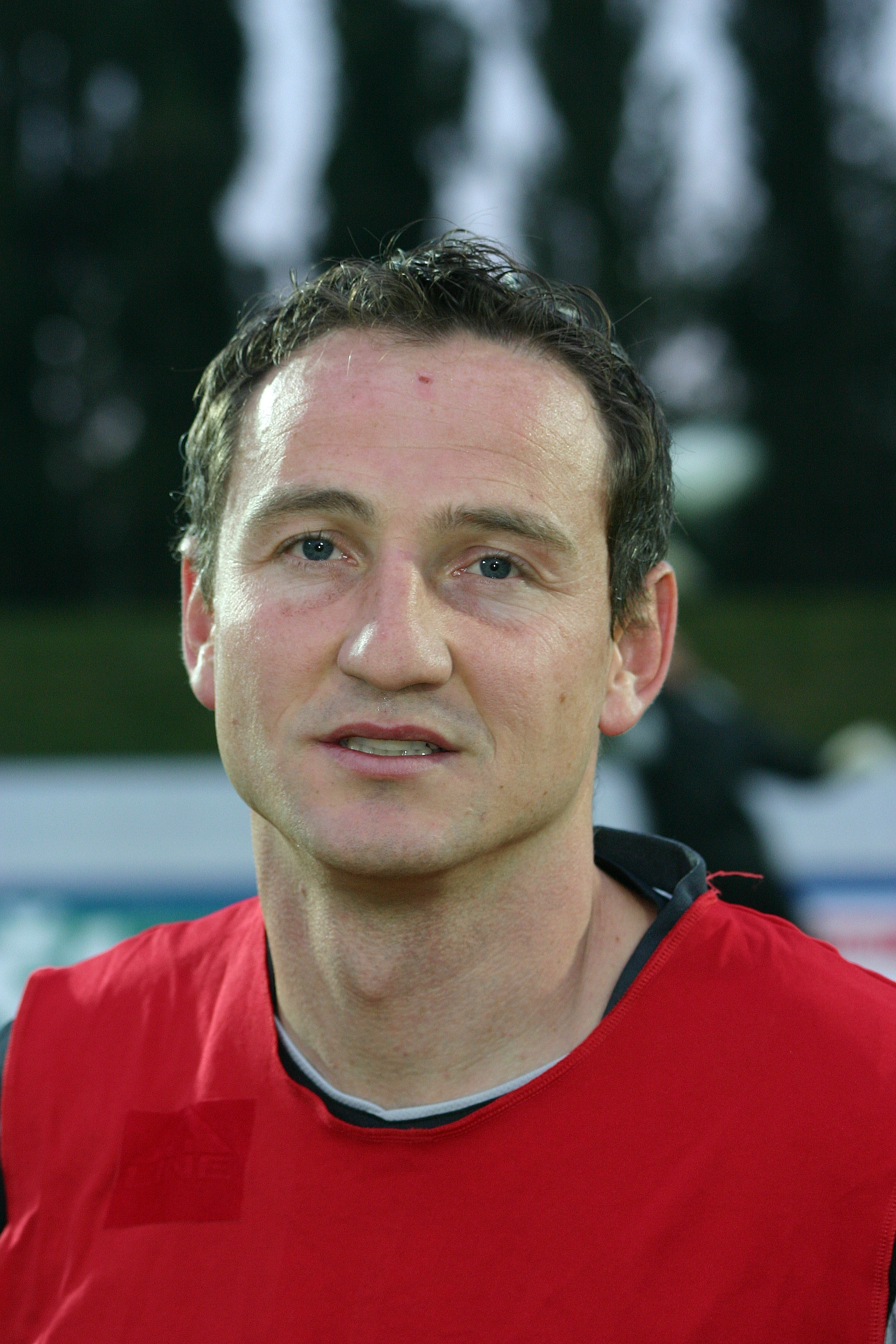
- Markus Hiden (DSV Leoben) 2008

Personal information
- Full name: Markus Hiden
- Date of birth: February 4, 1978 (age 48)
- Place of birth: Voitsberg, Austria
- Height: 1.78 m (5 ft 10 in)
- Position: Defensive midfielder

Youth career
- SV Ligist
- ASK Voitsberg
- DSV Leoben

Senior career*
Years	Team	Apps	(Gls)
1998–1999	Sturm Graz	0	(0)
1999–2001	SV Ried	70	(2)
2001–2006	Rapid Wien	111	(3)
2006–2007	AEL Limassol	7	(0)
2007–2008	Grazer AK	8	(0)
2008–2009	DSV Leoben	27	(2)
2010	FC Lankowitz	9	(0)
Total		232	(7)

International career
2001–2002	Austria	5	(0)

Managerial career
- 2010: FC Lankowitz (player-coach)
- 2011–2013: ASK Köflach
- 2013–2017: Sturm Graz (women)
- * Club domestic league appearances and goals

Markus Hiden (February 4, 1978 in Voitsberg) is an Austrian retired professional footballer and manager.

== Career ==
The West Steirer began with the football game at home SV Ligist. About the ASK Voitsberg and DSV Leoben, he found the way to Sturm Graz, 1998, he was there Austrian masters, and Austrian Bundesliga. About SV Ried went his way in 2001 at Rapid Wien, where in 2005 he was again champion. The summer transfer period 2006 Hiden moved to Cyprus and AEL Limassol, the end of January 2007, he signed a contract with Grazer AK.

== National team ==
Markus Hiden had completed 5 matches with the Austria national football team in 2001 and 2002.

== Coaching career ==
In the spring of 2010 he took over the role of player-coach at the Styrian lower division club FC Lankowitz, where he was released in summer 2010 after six months.

In December 2011 he took over as head coach at ASK Köflach. However, he was replaced in May 2013. In September 2013, he was appointed head coach of SK Sturm Graz' women's team. He left the position in the summer 2017.

== National team statistics ==
Austria national team
Year	Apps	Goals
2001	3	0
2002	2	0
Total	5	0

== Honours ==
- Austrian Bundesliga: 1999 (SK Sturm Graz); 2005 (Rapid Wien)
