= Andreas Lagonikakis =

Greek footballer

Personal information
- Full name: Andreas Lagonikakis
- Date of birth: 4 June 1972 (age 54)
- Place of birth: Athens, Greece
- Height: 1.77 m (5 ft 9 1/2 in)
- Positions: Left midfielder; left winger; central midfielder

Youth career
- –: Keravnos Keratea

Senior career*
Years	Team	Apps	(Gls)
1989–1990	Keravnos Keratea	31	(10)
1990–1994	Panionios	113	(22)
1994–1999	Panathinaikos	111	(6)
1999–2002	Rapid Wien	80	(8)
2002–2005	Panionios	46	(4)
2005–2007	Keravnos Keratea		

International career
1990–1994	Greece U21	8	(3)
- * Club domestic league appearances and goals

Andreas Lagonikakis (Greek: Ανδρέας Λαγωνικάκης; born 4 June 1972) is a former Greek football player.

== Panathinaikos ==
In 1994, he joined Panathinaikos from Panionios. There, he managed to participate in the European Champions' League where Panathinaikos managed to reach the semi-finals in the 1995–96 season. During his time in this club, he has played in a total of 11 champions' League games and he has scored 1 goal in this tournament. Being able to play in many positions, he was used by his coaches as a central midfielder, a wide midfielder, an attacking midfielder/trequartista, a winger on the left, a support striker, and even as a left wing-back on rare occasions.
