= Arnold Wetl =

Austrian footballer

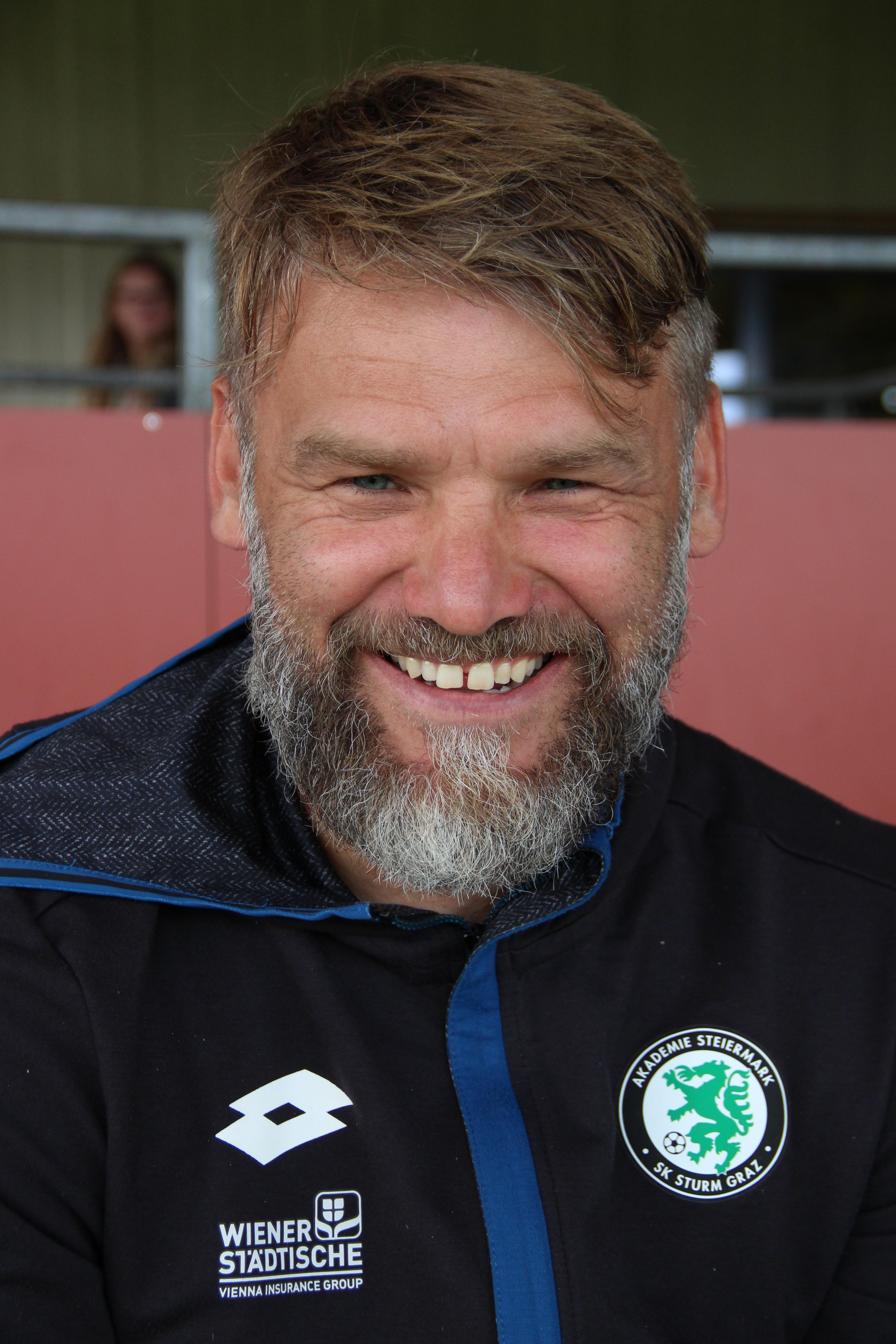

Personal information
- Full name: Arnold Wetl
- Date of birth: 2 February 1970 (age 56)
- Place of birth: Eibiswald, Austria
- Height: 1.78 m (5 ft 10 in)
- Position: Midfielder

Senior career*
Years	Team	Apps	(Gls)
1988–1996	Sturm Graz	160	(41)
1996–1997	FC Porto	11	(1)
1997–2001	Rapid Wien	96	(9)
2001–2004	Sturm Graz	69	(3)
2004–2006	FC Gratkorn	48	(7)

International career
1991–1999	Austria	21	(4)
- * Club domestic league appearances and goals

Arnold Wetl (born 2 February 1970 in Eibiswald) is a retired Austrian footballer who played as a midfielder.

== Club career ==
During his career he played for Sturm Graz, with whom he won 4 domestic cup titles, FC Porto, Rapid Wien and FC Gratkorn.

== International career ==
Wetl made his debut for Austria in an April 1991 friendly match against Norway and was a participant at the 1998 FIFA World Cup. He earned 21 caps, scoring 4 goals. His final international match was the embarrassing 0–9 defeat by Spain in a European Championship qualification match in March 1999.

=== International goals ===
Scores and results list Austria's goal tally first.

No	Date	Venue	Opponent	Score	Result	Competition
1.	22 May 1991	Stadion Lehen, Salzburg, Austria	Faroe Islands	3–0	3–0	Euro 1992 qualifier
2.	15 November 1995	Windsor Park, Belfast, Northern Ireland	Northern Ireland	3–5	3–5	Euro 1996 qualifier
3.	29 May 1996	Stadion Lehen, Salzburg, Austria	Czech Republic	1–0	1–0	Friendly match
4.	27 May 1998	Ernst-Happel-Stadion, Vienna, Austria	Tunisia	2–0	2–1	Friendly match

== Honours ==
- Austrian Cup (1):
  - 1996
- Portuguese Liga : (1)
  - 1996–97
- Portuguese Supercup (1):
  - 1996
