= Marek Penksa =

Slovak footballer (born 1973)

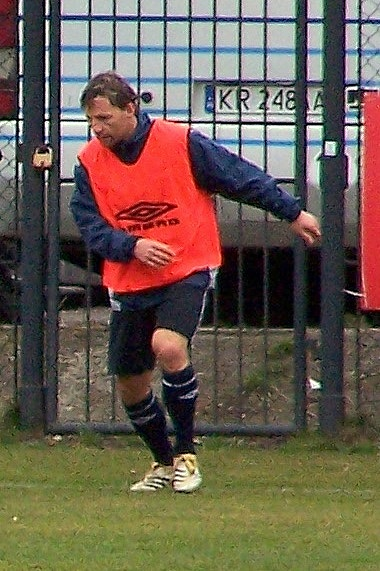

Personal information
- Date of birth: 4 August 1973 (age 53)
- Place of birth: Veľký Krtíš, Czechoslovakia
- Height: 1.72 m (5 ft 7 1/2 in)
- Position: Midfielder

Senior career*
Years	Team	Apps	(Gls)
1989–1992	Dukla Banská Bystrica	16	(1)
1992–1995	Eintracht Frankfurt	23	(0)
1993–1994	→ Dynamo Dresden (loan)	26	(3)
1995–1996	Grazer AK	16	(6)
1996–2000	Rapid Vienna	110	(18)
2000	DSV Leoben	12	(2)
2000–2001	Stuttgarter Kickers	10	(2)
2001–2002	Dunaferr SE	34	(15)
2002–2005	Ferencváros	73	(6)
2005–2007	Wisła Kraków	43	(4)
2007–2008	Dynamo Dresden	34	(5)
2008–2010	Tatran Prešov	29	(3)
2010–2011	Baník Ružiná		
2012	ASK Marienthal		
2012–2013	ŠK Tvrdošín		
2013–2014	Tatran Oravské Veselé	11	(8)
2014	Salgótarjáni		
2014–2015	Baník Veľký Krtíš		
2015–2016	TJ Baník Štiavnické Bane		
2016–2017	OŠK Sása		
2017	OTJ Hontianske Nemce		
2017–2018	Baník Veľký Krtíš		

International career
	Czechoslovakia U21	4	
1994–1995	Slovakia	7	(0)
Medal record
Men's football
Representing Czechoslovakia
UEFA European Under-16 Championship
Winner	1990 East Germany
- * Club domestic league appearances and goals

Marek Penksa (born 4 August 1973) is a Slovak former professional footballer who played as a midfielder. He played for the Slovak national team.

== Honours ==
Ferencváros

- Nemzeti Bajnokság I: 2003–04
- Magyar Kupa: 2002–03, 2003–04

Czechoslovakia U16

- UEFA European Under-16 Championship: 1990
