= Oliver Lederer =

Austrian footballer (born 1978)

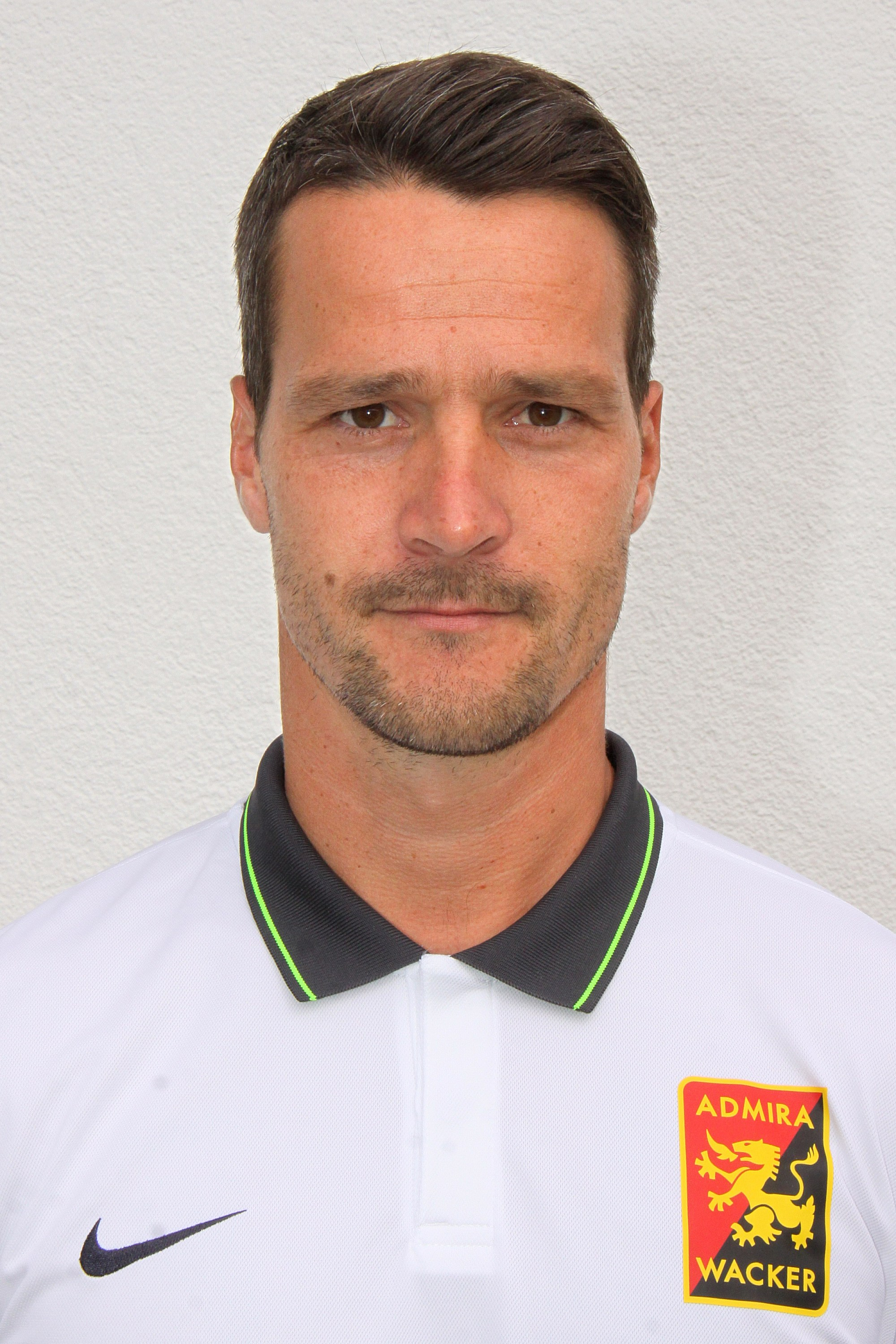
- Lederer in 2015

Personal information
- Date of birth: 2 January 1978 (age 48)
- Height: 1.80 m (5 ft 11 in)
- Position: Midfielder

Team information
- Current team: Austria U15 (manager)

Senior career*
Years	Team	Apps	(Gls)
1995–2002	Rapid Wien	32	(0)
1997–1998	→ Vfb Mödling (loan)	2	(0)
1998–1999	→ First Vienna (loan)	30	(2)
2002	Patraikos		
2003–2005	LASK Linz	57	(2)
2005	Admira Wacker Mödling	14	(0)
2005–2008	ASK Schwadorf	43	(2)
2008–2010	Trenkwalder Admira	12	(3)
2008–2010	→ Trenkwalder Admira Amateure	8	(3)
2010–2012	FC Leopoldsdorf		
2012	1. SC Pfaffstätten		

Managerial career
- 2010–2013: Admira Amateure
- 2013–2016: Admira (assistant)
- 2013: Admira (caretaker)
- 2015: Admira (caretaker)
- 2016–2017: Admira
- 2017–2018: SKN St. Pölten
- 2018–2020: FCM Traiskirchen
- 2020–: Austria U15
- * Club domestic league appearances and goals

Oliver Lederer (born 2 January 1978) is an Austrian football manager and a former player who coaches the Austria U15 national team.

== Coaching career ==
On 30 July 2020, Lederer was appointed manager of the Austria national football team for the players born in 2006 (at that time, Under-15).
