= Günter Schießwald =

Austrian footballer

Personal information
- Date of birth: 25 September 1973 (age 53)
- Height: 1.88 m (6 ft 2 in)
- Position: Defender

Youth career
- SR Donaufeld

Senior career*
| Years | Team | Apps | (Gls) |
| 1994–1998 | FK Austria Wien | | |
| 1998–2003 | SK Rapid Wien | | |
| 2003–2005 | SC Untersiebenbrunn | | |
| 2005–2007 | FK Austria Wien Amateure | 34 | (2) |
| 2007–2008 | FC Mistelbach | | |
| 2008-2011 | FK Blau Weiss Hollabrunn | | |

International career^{‡}
| 1999-2001 | Austria | 2 | (0) |
- * Club domestic league appearances and goals as of 21:24, 14 December 2008 (UTC) ‡ National team caps and goals as of 21:24, 14 December 2008 (UTC)

Günter Schießwald (born 25 September 1973) is an Austrian retired football player who last played for FK Blau Weiss Hollabrunn.
