= Ante Jazić =

Canadian soccer player (born 1976)

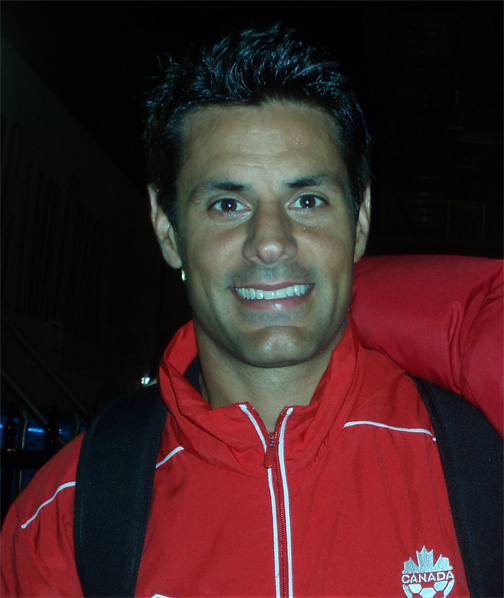
- Jazić in 2012

Personal information
- Date of birth: February 26, 1976 (age 50)
- Place of birth: Bedford, Nova Scotia, Canada
- Height: 1.80 m (5 ft 11 in)
- Position: Left back

Youth career
- 1995: Scotia Soccer Club
- 1996: Dalhousie Tigers

Senior career*
Years	Team	Apps	(Gls)
1996–1999	Hrvatski Dragovoljac	54	(4)
1999–2000	Hajduk Split	40	(1)
2001–2004	Rapid Vienna	107	(1)
2004–2005	Kuban Krasnodar	11	(0)
2006–2008	Los Angeles Galaxy	44	(0)
2009–2012	Chivas USA	89	(0)
Total		345	(6)

International career
1998–2012	Canada	36	(1)
- * Club domestic league appearances and goals

Ante Jazić (born February 26, 1976) is a Canadian retired soccer player.

== Club career ==
=== Youth ===
Growing up in Bedford, Jazić started his soccer career as a youth player for Scotia Soccer Club. As a senior level, he played for one the nation's strongest amateur teams at the time, Halifax King of Donair, and a year with Dalhousie University in which he was named All-Canadian CIAU.

=== Professional ===
Jazić began his professional career by joining NK Hrvatski Dragovoljac in 1997 after a successful try-out arranged by an uncle in Croatia. After two years with Dragovoljac, he joined Croatian First League club Hajduk Split for the 1999-00 and 2000–01 seasons.

Jazić then played four seasons with Rapid Vienna in the Austrian Football Bundesliga. He played for FC Kuban Krasnodar in the Russian Premier League in the 2006 season. Kuban were relegated to the Russian First Division for 2005. On June 27, 2006, he signed a contract with Los Angeles Galaxy of Major League Soccer, where he would spend the next two years.

On January 15, 2009, Jazić was traded to Chivas USA along with the Galaxy's 35th- and 49th-overall picks in the 2009 MLS SuperDraft in exchange for Chivas' second-round pick (19th-overall), which the Galaxy used to select defender A. J. DeLaGarza.

Jazić re-signed with Chivas USA for the 2012 season, his fourth with the club, on December 2, 2011.

Jazić has worked as head coach of the Canada under-15 national team.

== International career ==
He made his debut for Canada in a May 1998 friendly match against Macedonia.

=== International goals ===
Scores and results list Canada's goal tally first.

#	Date	Venue	Opponent	Score	Result	Competition
1	June 4, 2008	Sunrise, Florida, United States	Panama	2–2	2–2	Friendly match

== Personal life ==
Jazić is of Croatian descent. He is married to Annemarie Dillard Jazic, whose family started Dillard's department stores.

== Honours ==
=== Club ===
Hajduk Split

- Prva HNL: 2000–01
- Croatian Cup: 1999-2000
