= Roman Wallner =

Austrian former professional footballer (born 1982)

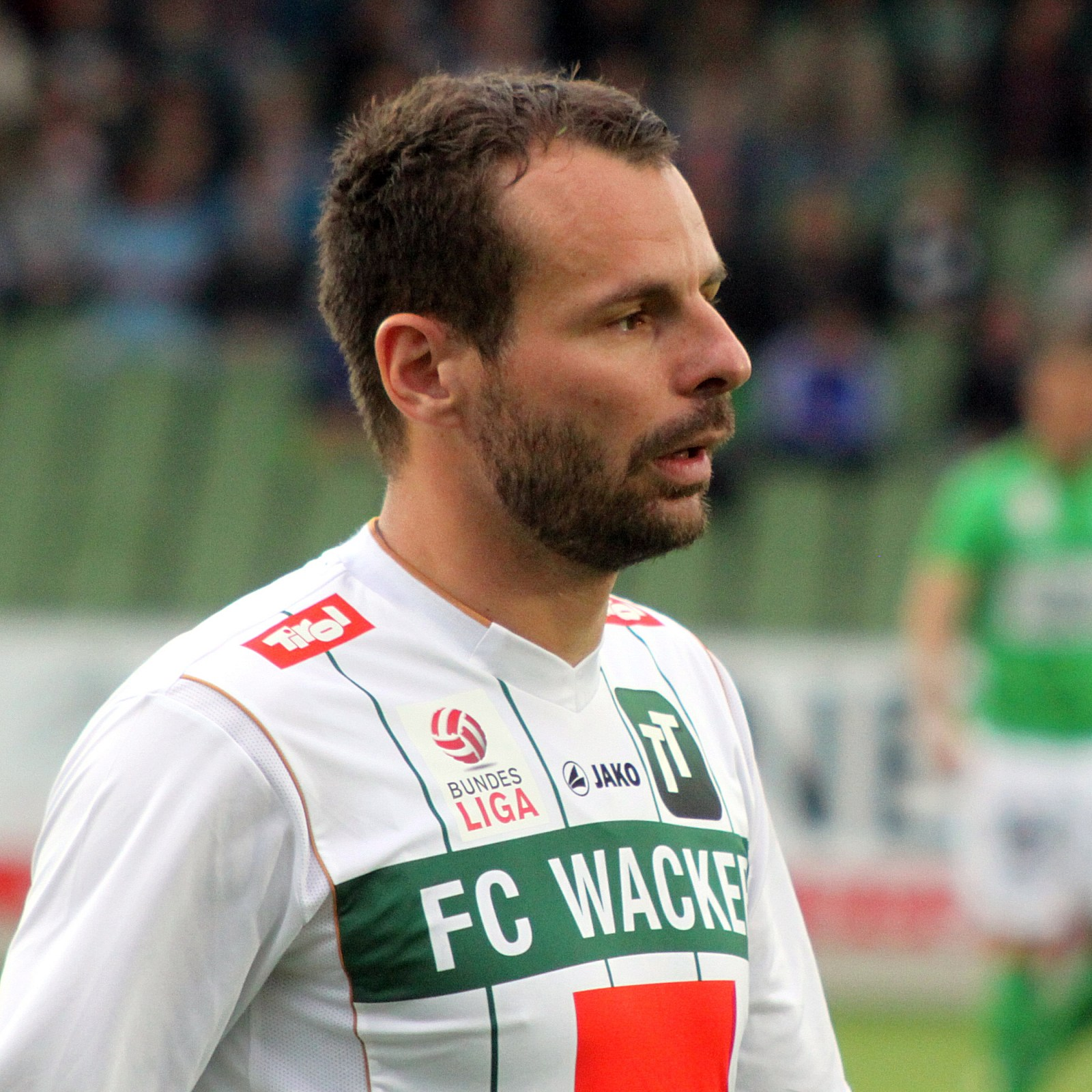

Personal information
- Full name: Roman Wallner
- Date of birth: 4 February 1982 (age 44)
- Place of birth: Graz, Styria, Austria
- Height: 1.76 m (5 ft 9 in)
- Position: Forward

Team information
- Current team: Salzburger AK (manager)

Youth career
- 1988–1998: Sturm Graz

Senior career*
Years	Team	Apps	(Gls)
1998–1999	Sturm Graz	0	(0)
1999–2004	Rapid Vienna	134	(42)
2004–2006	Hannover 96	10	(0)
2005	→ Admira Wacker (loan)	15	(1)
2006	→ Austria Vienna (loan)	9	(0)
2006–2007	Austria Vienna	30	(6)
2007–2008	Falkirk	2	(0)
2007	→ Hamilton Academical (loan)	3	(1)
2008	Apollon Kalamarias	1	(0)
2008–2009	Skoda Xanthi	3	(1)
2009–2010	LASK Linz	30	(17)
2010–2012	Red Bull Salzburg	60	(24)
2012	RB Leipzig	7	(5)
2012–2015	FC Wacker Innsbruck	52	(14)
2015–2019	SV Grödig	51	(17)
Total		407	(128)

International career
2001–2010	Austria	29	(7)

Managerial career
- 2019: Salzburger AK (caretaker)
- 2020–2023: Salzburger AK
- 2023–2024: SCR Altach (assistant)
- * Club domestic league appearances and goals

Roman Wallner (born 4 February 1982) is an Austrian former professional footballer who played as a forward and manager. He was Salzburger AK 1914's manager.

== Club career ==
Born in Graz, Styria, Wallner began his career with hometown Sturm Graz in 1998. In the following year he moved to Rapid Wien, where he would have his most successful years, appearing in over 100 matches and scoring 42 goals over five seasons with the club. He then spent one-year spells at German club Hannover 96 and VfB Admira Wacker Mödling before signing with Austria Vienna in 2005. He left the club in 2007.

At the beginning of the 2007–08 season, Wallner signed a one-year contract including the option of a 2nd year with Scottish Premier League outfit Falkirk F.C.

In November 2007, Roman signed for Scottish First Division Hamilton Academical on loan from Falkirk, scoring once in four games against Stirling Albion. He returned to Falkirk the following month.

In January 2008, he travelled to Greece where he was on trial for the Greek Cup 2006–07 winners AEL In the same month Falkirk announced that Wallner had been released from his contract by mutual consent. In late January, he signed with Apollon Kalamarias.

On 3 February 2008, Apollon Kalamarias' player Barkoglou scored a last minute goal in a match against Olympiacos which ended 1–0 to Apollon. Olympiacos appealed Wallner's appearance in the match, because according to FIFA rules a player could play for no more than two teams per season (having already played for Falkirk and Hamilton Academical), because of this Apollon lost the game in cards 0–3 and had 1 point deducted. The case went to the jurisdiction of CAS. The appeal for provisional measures was declined. After the end of the Super League Greece, Apollon Kalamarias were relegated and the deducted points would be inefficient to keep them clear of relegation. Therefore, the appeal against the first decision was withdrawn. Olympiacos won the title leading the table with runners-up AEK Athens trailing by only two points. This fact, along with the claims by the AEK chairman Demis Nikolaidis and footballers like Rivaldo, Traianos Dellas and Nikos Liberopoulos that the HFF was responsible for this outcome, left the supporters of AEK with a taste of injustice. By then, Roman Wallner was one of the most identifiable and recnognisable footballers in Greece and the controversy about his case will be remembered by all the Greek football fans in the years to come.

== International career ==
He made his debut for Austria on 25 April 2001 at 2002 FIFA World Cup qualification match against Liechtenstein.

== Coaching career ==
After retiring, Wallner was hired by Salzburger AK 1914 as an individual coach both for the first team but also for the youth teams, mainly be responsible for the strikers. On 17 October 2019, Wallner was appointed caretaker manager for the last three games of the year, following the departure of Andreas Fötschl.

On 1 May 2020 Wallner was appointed Salzburger AK 1914 manager.

== Career statistics ==
=== International ===
Austria national team
Year	Apps	Goals
2001	4	0
2002	8	3
2003	3	2
2004	4	0
2005	1	0
2006	3	0
2007	0	0
2008	0	0
2009	4	1
2010	2	1
Total	29	7

== Honours ==
=== Club ===
Austria Wien

- Austrian Football Bundesliga (2): 2006
- Austrian Cup (2): 2006, 2007 with Austria Wien

Red Bull Salzburg

- Austrian Football Bundesliga: 2010

=== Individual ===
- Austrian Footballer of the Year: 2001
