= Jürgen Saler =

Austrian footballer

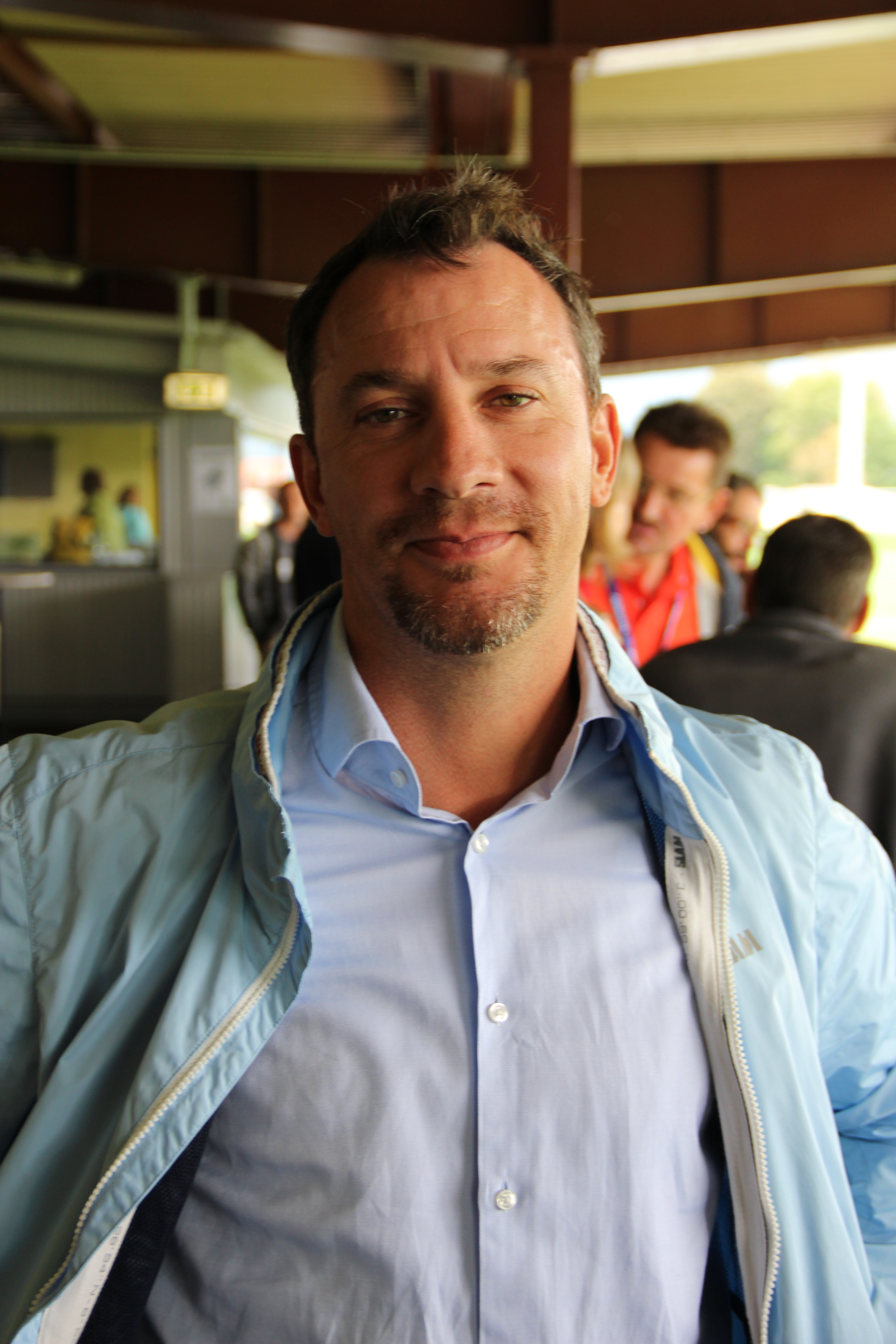

Personal information
- Date of birth: 4 October 1977 (age 49)
- Place of birth: Knittelfeld
- Height: 1.75 m (5 ft 9 in)
- Position: Midfielder

Youth career
- Rot-Weiß Knittelfeld

Senior career*
Years	Team	Apps	(Gls)
–1998	DSV Leoben	50	(8)
1998–2003	Rapid Wien	94	(4)
2003–2008	Kapfenberger SV	114	(20)
2008–2010	WAC/St. Andrä	30	(1)
- * Club domestic league appearances and goals

Jürgen Saler (born 4 October 1977) is a retired Austrian footballer.
