= Oliver Freund =

German footballer

Personal information
- Date of birth: 15 April 1970 (age 56)
- Place of birth: Freiburg, Germany
- Height: 1.89 m (6 ft 2 in)
- Position: Midfielder

Youth career
- FV Lörrach

Senior career*
Years	Team	Apps	(Gls)
1989–1990	Werder Bremen (A)		
1989–1991	Werder Bremen	1	(0)
1991–1992	Hannover 96	10	(0)
1992–1997	SC Freiburg	125	(8)
1997–2002	Rapid Wien	126	(6)
2002–2003	VfL Osnabrück	7	(0)
- * Club domestic league appearances and goals

Oliver Freund (born 15 April 1970) is a German former professional footballer who played as a midfielder.

== Career ==
Freund joined Werder Bremen's U19 youth team from FV Lörrach in 1989.

== Honours ==
Werder Bremen (A)

- German amateur football championship: 1990–91

Hannover 96

- DFB-Pokal: 1991–92

SC Freiburg

- 2. Bundesliga: 1992–93
