= Thomas Zingler =

Austrian footballer

Personal information
- Date of birth: 21 August 1970 (age 56)
- Height: 1.92 m (6 ft 3 1/2 in)
- Position: Defender

Senior career*
Years	Team	Apps	(Gls)
1989–1996	Admira/Wacker	173	(5)
1996–2002	Rapid Wien	112	(9)
2002–2005	Admira/Wacker	58	(1)

International career
1989–1991	Austria U21	12	(0)
- * Club domestic league appearances and goals

Thomas Zingler (born 21 August 1970) is an Austrian former footballer.
