= ImmoAgentur Stadion =

Multi-use stadium in Bregenz, Austria

Coordinates: 47°30′14.08″N 9°44′0.23″E

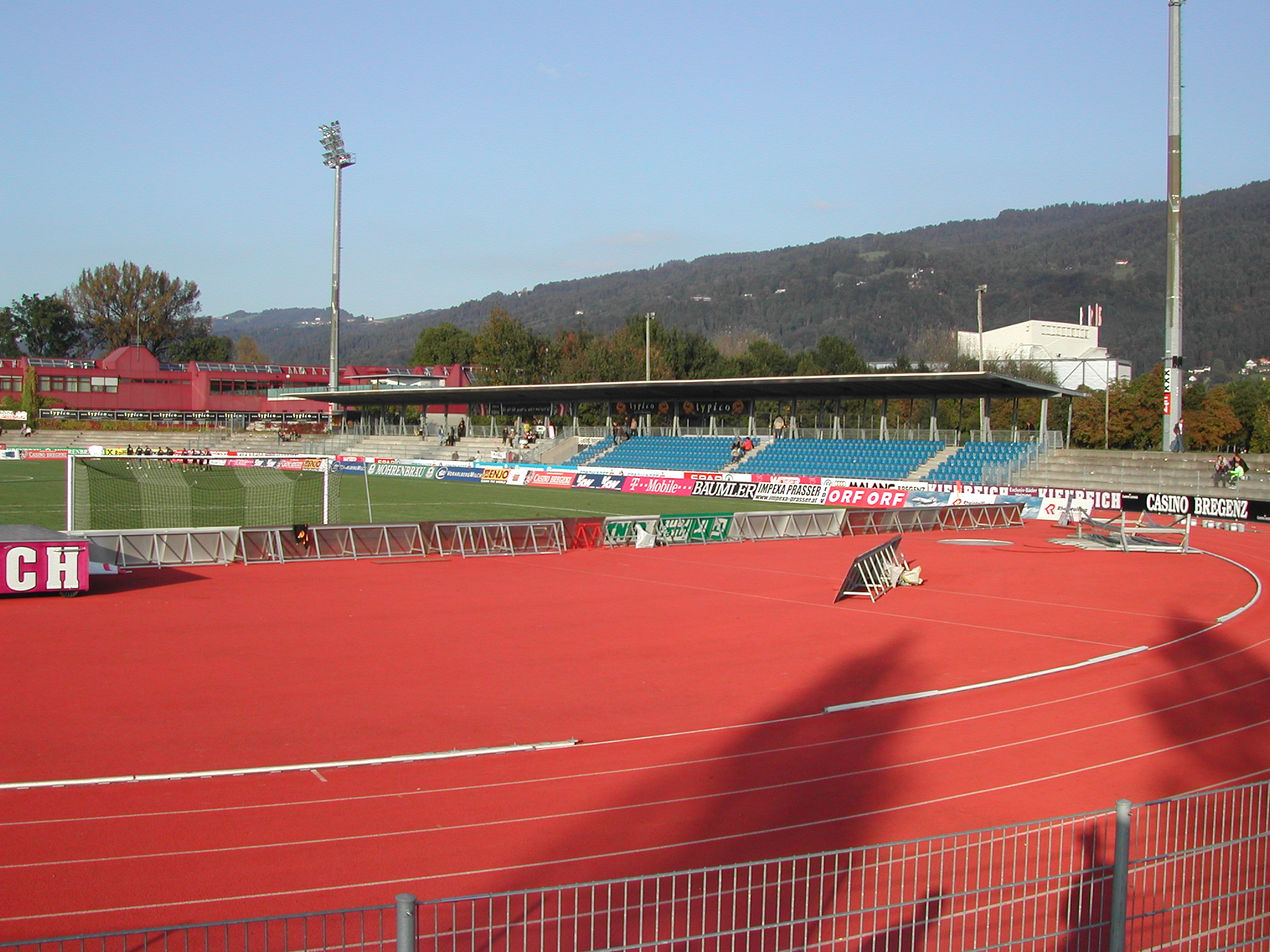

ImmoAgentur Stadion is a multi-use stadium in Bregenz, Austria. It is currently used mostly for football matches and it is the home ground of SW Bregenz. The stadium has a capacity of 5,000.
