= Krzysztof Ratajczyk =

Polish footballer

Personal information
- Full name: Krzysztof Ratajczyk
- Date of birth: 9 November 1973 (age 52)
- Place of birth: Poznań, Poland
- Height: 1.86 m (6 ft 1 in)
- Position: Defender

Youth career
- Warta Poznań

Senior career*
Years	Team	Apps	(Gls)
1991–1996	Legia Warsaw	127	(3)
1996–2001	Rapid Wien	142	(8)
2001–2005	Austria Wien	72	(1)
2005–2007	SV Mattersburg	47	(0)
2008	SC Schwanenstadt	10	(0)
2008–2009	FAC Wien	14	(1)
2009–2010	FC Polska Wien	13	(6)
2010–2011	UFC Weiden am See	12	(0)
2011–2012	FC Polska Wien	8	(0)
2014	SC Berndorf	6	(0)
2021	UFC Schützen am Gebirge	4	(0)

International career
- Poland U16
1994–2003	Poland	16	(3)
Medal record
Representing Poland
Men's football
UEFA European Under-16 Championship
Third place	1990 East Germany
- * Club domestic league appearances and goals

Krzysztof Ratajczyk (born 9 November 1973) is a Polish former professional footballer who played as a defender.

== Club career ==
He started his career at Warta Poznań. After five years at Legia Warsaw, he moved to Rapid Wien in 1996, where he was most successful. He was very popular, especially because of his hard style to play (for example: he knocked an opponent forward into the third seat row in a pre-season match) and became captain of the side.

Although Rapid renewed his contract despite many long-term injuries, Ratajczyk moved in 2002 (as skipper of the team) to bitter rivals Austria Wien. As a result of this "betrayal", feelings ran high and he was beaten down by four Rapid fans.

Ratajczyk joined SV Mattersburg in 2005, where he spent two years. In January 2008 he had no contract until the Red Zac league SC Schwanenstadt offered him one. After Schwanenstadt's demise, he moved to FAC Team für Wien in the Regionalliga.

== International career ==
He made his debut for Poland in an August 1994 friendly match against Belarus and went on to earn 16 caps, scoring 3 goals.

== Honours ==
Legia Warsaw

- Ekstraklasa: 1993–94, 1994–95
- Polish Cup: 1993–94, 1994–95
- Polish Super Cup: 1994

Austria Wien

- Austrian Bundesliga: 2002–03
- Austrian Cup: 2002–03, 2004–05
- Austrian Supercup: 2003

Poland U16

- UEFA European Under-16 Championship third place: 1990
