= Ladislav Maier =

Czech footballer (born 1966)

Personal information
- Date of birth: 4 January 1966 (age 60)
- Place of birth: Boskovice, Czechoslovakia
- Height: 1.86 m (6 ft 1 in)
- Position: Goalkeeper

Youth career
- 1972–1978: Sokol Lažany
- 1978–1988: ČKD Blansko

Senior career*
Years	Team	Apps	(Gls)
1988–1989	JZD Drnovice		
1990	Zbrojovka Brno	0	(0)
1990–1991	Gera Drnovice		
1992–1998	Slovan Liberec	148	(0)
1998–2005	Rapid Wien	161	(0)

International career
1995–2001	Czech Republic	7	(0)
Medal record
Men's football
Representing Czech Republic
UEFA European Championship
Runner-up	1996 England
- * Club domestic league appearances and goals

Ladislav Maier (born 4 January 1966 in Boskovice) is a Czech former professional footballer who played as a goalkeeper.

At club level, Maier helped Slovan Liberec win promotion to the Czech First League in 1993, going on to make 148 First League appearances for the club over the course of five seasons. He played seven matches for the Czech Republic between 1995 and 2001, being named in his nation's squad for Euro 1996 and Euro 2000, although he played at neither tournament.

Maier played for Austrian club Rapid Wien, winning the 2004–05 Austrian Football Bundesliga there. Following seven years with the club, he concluded his playing career in 2005. After head coach Lothar Matthäus left Rapid in 2002 after leading the club to a record low finishing position of eighth, Maier called him "the biggest fool ever" and claimed that even the cleaners were pleased that Matthäus had left the club.
