= Stadion Lehen =

Football stadium in Salzburg, Austria

Coordinates: 47°48′48″N 13°1′39″E

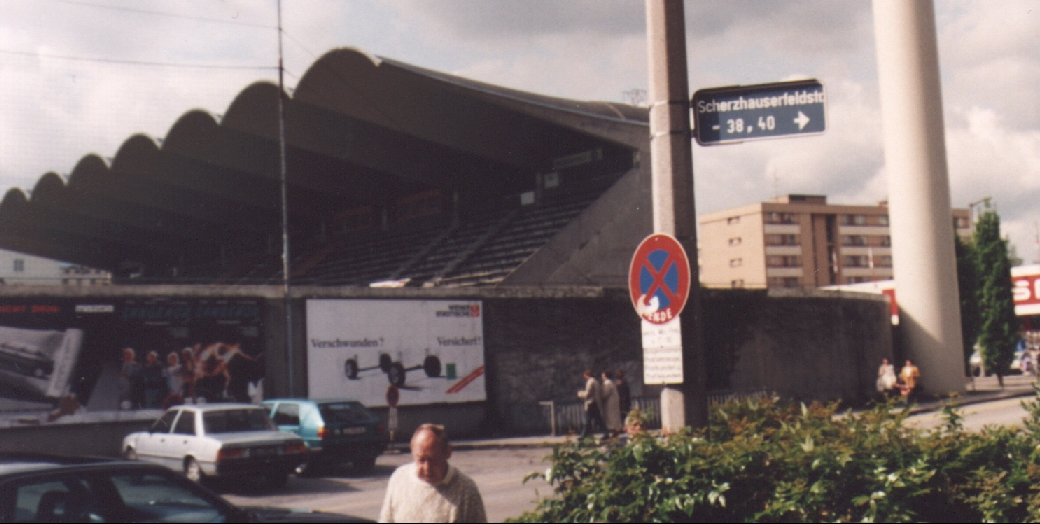
Stadion Lehen

Stadion Lehen (German pronunciation: [ˌʃtaːdi̯ɔn ˈleː.ən]) was a multi-purpose stadium in Salzburg, Austria. It was used mostly for football matches and hosted the home matches of SV Austria Salzburg. The stadium was able to hold 14,684 people and originally opened in 1952. It was renovated in 1971. It hosted its last SV Austria Salzburg match in 2002, prior to Wals Siezenheim Stadium in 2003. In 2006, the stadium was demolished.
