= René Wagner =

Czech footballer and manager

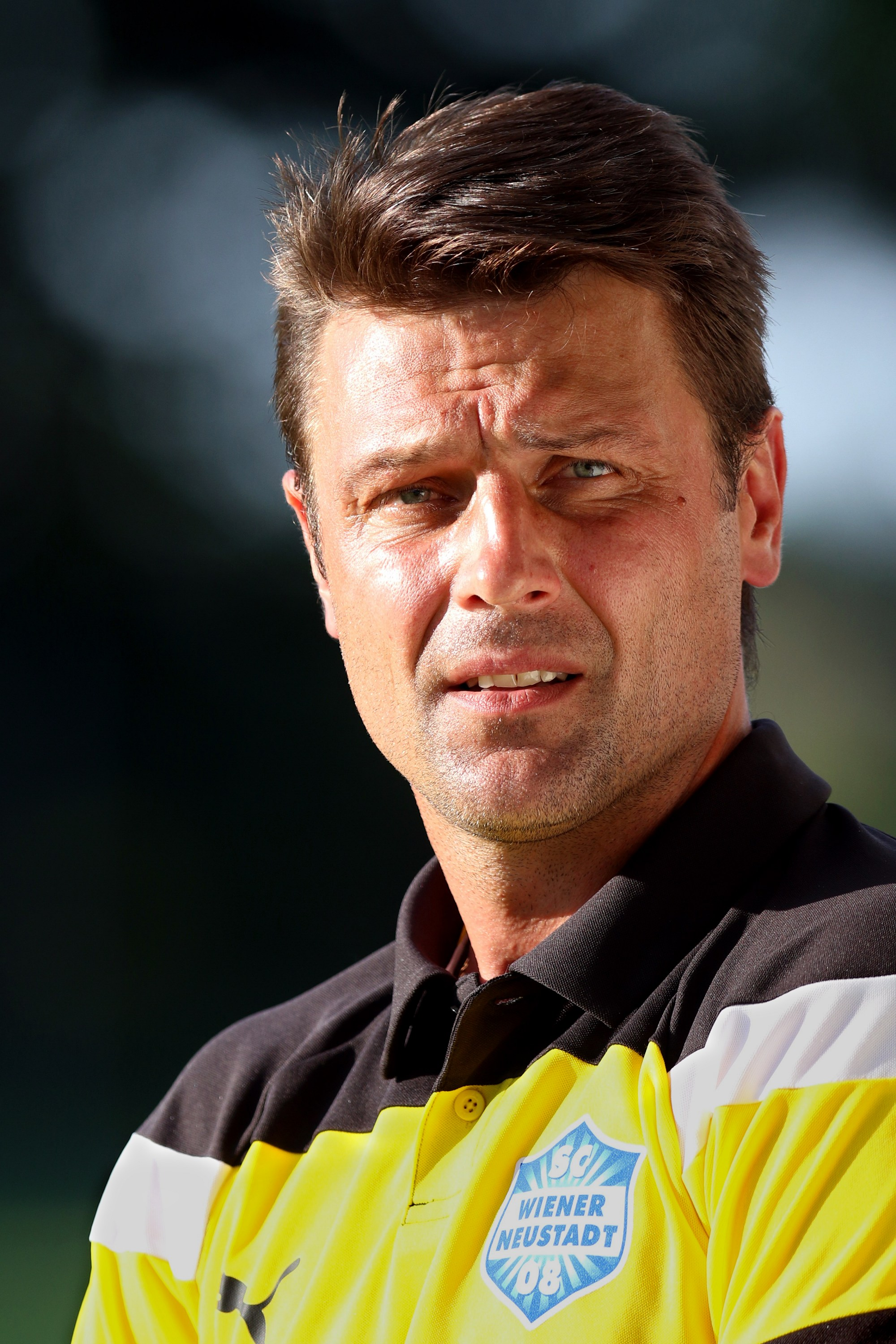
- Wagner in 2016

Personal information
- Date of birth: 31 October 1972 (age 53)
- Place of birth: Brno, Czechoslovakia
- Height: 1.83 m (6 ft 0 in)
- Position: Forward

Youth career
- 1978–1987: TJ KPS Brno
- 1987–1991: Zbrojovka Brno

Senior career*
Years	Team	Apps	(Gls)
1991–1996	FC Boby Brno	129	(42)
1996–2004	Rapid Wien	220	(75)
2004–2006	SV Mattersburg	45	(7)
2006–2008	1. FC Brno	42	(5)
2008–2010	SV Leobendorf	28	(21)
2010	FC Sparta Brno	8	(1)
Total		472	(148)

International career
1995–2001	Czech Republic	11	(3)

Managerial career
- 2011: FC Zbrojovka Brno
- 2016–2017: SC Wiener Neustadt
- * Club domestic league appearances and goals

René Wagner (born 31 October 1972) is a Czech football manager and former player.

Born in Brno, Wagner played in his career mostly for FC Zbrojovka Brno and SK Rapid Wien in Austria. In April 2011 he was named the manager of FC Zbrojovka Brno, replacing previous coach Karel Večeřa. After winning just two games of sixteen games in charge, Wagner was dismissed in October 2011.

Wagner was named the manager of SC Wiener Neustadt in April 2016.
