= 1998–99 Austrian Cup =

Tournament details
- Country: Austria

Final positions
- Champions: Sturm Graz
- Runners-up: LASK

Tournament statistics
- Top goal scorer: Ivan Adzic (3)

The 1998–99 Austrian Cup (German: ÖFB-Cup) was the 65th season of Austria's nationwide football cup competition. The final was held at the Ernst-Happel-Stadion, Vienna on 18 May 1999.

The competition was won by Sturm Graz after beating LASK 4–2 on penalties after the match finished 1-1 after extra time.

== First round ==
Team 1	Score	Team 2
FC Puch	2–3	Austria Salzburg Amatuere
SV Esternberg	1–0	USK Anif
FC Waidhofen/Ybbs	2–1	Salzburger AK 1914
ASKÖ Pasching	2–0 (a.e.t.)	SV Bürmoos
SC Rheindorf Altach	0–0 (a.e.t.) (3–1 p)	Schwarzach/Pingau
SVG Reichenau	1–1 (a.e.t.) (5–4 p)	SPG Axams/Götzens
Lendorf	2–1	SV Rothenthurn
SV Stadlau	2–4	SC Eisenstadt
SAK Klagenfurt	3–1	ASK Köflach
Sturm 19 St. Pölten	1–1 (a.e.t.) (8–7 p)	SV Wienerberg
Tulln	1–0	SR Donaufeld
Wiener Neustadt	1–3	Himberg
ASK Kottingbrunn	2–1	Prater SV
Asten	1–5	ASKÖ Donau Linz
Kapfenberger SV	3–1	FC Gratkorn
Sankt Magdalena	0–0 (a.e.t.) (2–4 p)	SK Eintracht Wels
Wolfsberger AC	1–1 (a.e.t.) (4–5 p)	TSV Pöllau
SC Untersiebenbrunn	5–2 (a.e.t.)	UFC Tadten
SV Neuberg	0–4	FC Deutschkreutz
Oberndorf	5–2	Engelhartsstetten
1. SV Wiener Neudorf	0–1	ASK Klingenbach
SV Würmla	5–1	UFC St. Peter/Au
Kremser SC	3–3 (a.e.t.) (6–7 p)	FAC Team fur Wien
ASK Hirm	3–6	SV Horn
Gmünd	4–2	Güssing
SC Zwettl	1–0	Admira Landhaus
NAC	1–5	Landstraßer AC Wien
SV Mattersburg	3–0	SV Langenrohr
Red Star/Rapid	1–2 (a.e.t.)	Schwechat
Union St. Florian	1–0	FC Blau-Weiß Linz
SV Bad Schallerbach	5–0	TSV Ottensheim
Rohrbach/Berg	0–2	ATSV Sattledt
Bad Ischl	0–1	Grieskirchen
Leibnitz	2–0	Kindberg
FC Zeltweg	2–0	ASK Voitsberg
Rapid Lienz	1–0	Feldbach
SV Leibnitz Flavia Solva	0–4	TSV Hartberg
GAK Amateure	1–0 (a.e.t.)	FC St. Veit
Rötis	0–4	WSG Wattens
SVG Bleiburg	3–2 (a.e.t.)	Rottenmann
St. Michael	2–4	LUV Graz
FC Hard	2–0 (a.e.t.)	SV Hall
SC Kundl	0–3	FC Lustenau 07
FC Kufstein	0–1	Rum

== Second round ==
The second-round games were played on August 21 – 23, 1998.

Team 1	Score	Team 2
21 August 1998
ASK Klingenbach	1–3	SV Spittal/Drau
ASKÖ Pasching	0–1	Eintracht Wels
Kapfenberger SV	0–4	First Vienna FC
LUV/Sturm Graz Amateure	0–3	SV Braunau
SAK Klagenfurt	1–5	Grazer AK
SC Eisenstadt	2–1	SK Vorwärts Steyr
SC Untersiebenbrunn	3–1	SC Himberg
SC Zwettl	1–2 (a.e.t.)	FCN St. Pölten
SV Austria Salzburg Amateure	0–2	LASK
TSV Pöllau	1–1 (a.e.t.) (4–5 p)	ASK Kottingbrunn
WSG Wattens	0–4	VfB Admira/Wacker Mödling
ASKÖ Donau Linz	0–2 (a.e.t.)	SC Austria Lustenau
22 August 1998
ESK/Grazer AK Amateure	0–4	Sturm Graz
FC Deutschkreuz	2–4	SVG Reichenau
FC Waidhofen/Ybbs	3–2 (a.e.t.)	SV Würmla
FC Zeltweg	0–2	SV Wörgl
Floridsdorfer AC	0–3	Austria Salzburg
Landstraßer AC Wien	2–8	Austria Klagenfurt
FC Hard	2–2 (a.e.t.) (3–5 p)	SV Stockerau
SC Rheindorf Altach	1–1 (a.e.t.) (4–3 p)	FK Austria Wien
FC Tulln	2–1	ATSV Sattledt
SPG Rum	1–3	SC Bregenz
SV Bad Schallerbach	1–2	SV Ried
SV Horn	4–0	SV Esternberg
SV Leibnitz	4–1	EPSV Gmünd
SV Lendorf	1–6	DSV Leoben
SV Mattersburg	2–1	FC Tirol Innsbruck
SV Oberndorf	0–8	Rapid Wien
SV Schwechat	3–1	Rapid Lienz
SVG Bleiburg	2–1	SV Grieskirchen
Sturm 19 St. Pölten	3–4	FC Lustenau 07
Union St. Florian	2–1	TSV Hartberg

=== Matches ===
21 August 1998	ASK Klingenbach	1–3	SV Spittal/Drau	Klingenbach
17:45	Kalss 79'	Report	Maier 16'; Tresnjic 80'; Dragoslavić 89'	Attendance: 250; Referee: Richard Kern

21 August 1998	ASKÖ Pasching	0–1	Eintracht Wels	Pasching
19:30		Report	Topf 55'	Attendance: 500; Referee: Erhard Fuchs-Eisner

21 August 1998	Kapfenberger SV	0–4	First Vienna	Kapfenberg
19:00		Report	Stary 5', 38'; Aberle 47' ten Heuvel 56'	Stadium: Alpenstadion; Attendance: 600; Referee: Karl Finzinger

21 August 1998	SLUV/Sturm Graz Amateure	0–3	SV Braunau	Graz
19:00		Report	Bojceski 18'; Micheu 38', 56'	Stadium: Sturm-Platz; Attendance: 300; Referee: Manfred Krassnitzer

21 August 1998	SAK Klagenfurt	1–5	Grazer AK	Klagenfurt
17:30	Oraze 90'	Report	Ehmann 9'; Brenner 43', 65'; Wieger 45'; Golombek 74'	Stadium: Annabichl; Attendance: 1,300; Referee: Ewald Hammer

21 August 1998	SC Eisenstadt	2–1	SK Vorwärts Steyr	Eisenstadt
19:30	Leonhardsberger 69'; Burgemeister 90'	Report	Hickersberger 67'	Stadium: Lindenstadion; Attendance: 300; Referee: Eduard Freunthaller

21 August 1998	SC Untersiebenbrunn	3–1	SC Himberg	Untersiebenbrunn
17:30	Wetrowsky 3', 50'; Sekulia 65'	Report	Buchebner 47'	Attendance: 600; Referee: Sebastian Klauber-Larsen

21 August 1998	SC Zwettl	3–4 (a.e.t.)	FCN St. Pölten	Zwettl
19:30	Mrsic 20', 49'; Ljubicic 105'	Report	Wachter 85'; Rühmkorf 90'; Akagündüz 96'; Skokan 115'	Attendance: 1,000; Referee: Franz Schwarzl

21 August 1998	SV Austria Salzburg Amateure	0–2	LASK	Salzburg
18:30		Report	Kogler 12'; Frigård 78'	Stadium: Stadion Lehen; Attendance: 500; Referee: Michael Daxauer

21 August 1998	TSV Pöllau	1–1 (a.e.t.) (4–5 p)	ASK Kottingbrunn	Pöllau
19:00	Kalcher 39'	Report	Opel 50'	Referee: Karl Stöbich

21 August 1998	WSG Wattens	0–4	VfB Admira/Wacker Mödling	Wattens
19:00		Report	Aigner 45'; Schwellensattl 83', 89'; Mráz 90+2'	Stadium: Alpenstadion; Attendance: 350; Referee: Robert Schörgenhofer

21 August 1998	ASKÖ Donau Linz	0–2 (a.e.t.)	SC Austria Lustenau	Linz
19:00	Jager (yellow card) 59' (red card)	Report	Kosturkov 108'; Moitzi 110'	Stadium: Kleinmünchen; Attendance: 1,000; Referee: Franz Maislinger

22 August 1998	ESK/Grazer AK Amateure	0–4	Sturm Graz	Graz
15:30		Report	Neukirchner 14'; Haas 41' (pen.), 69'; Popović 79'	Stadium: Eggenberg; Attendance: 3,000; Referee: Wolfgang Smole

22 August 1998	FC Deutschkreuz	2–4	SVG Reichenau	Deutschkreuz
15:30	Ponwieser 5'; Karoly 85'	Report	Spielmann 40'; Köll 45', 52'; Schneidermayer 71'	Attendance: 700; Referee: Andreas Fellinger

22 August 1998	FC Waidhofen/Ybbs	3–2 (a.e.t.)	SV Würmla	Waidhofen an der Ybbs
19:00	Miladinovic 25'; Burits 32'; Perner 105'	Report	Varga 43'; Pfaffl 45'	Attendance: 650; Referee: Thomas Laschober

22 August 1998	FC Zeltweg	0–2	SV Wörgl	Zeltweg
15:30		Report	Music 43'; Silberberger 47'	Stadium: Aichfeldstadion; Attendance: 350; Referee: Harald Denthaner

22 August 1998	Floridsdorfer AC	0–3	Austria Salzburg	Wien
15:30		Report	Glieder 16'; Koejoe 56'; Nikolic 69'	Stadium: FAC-Platz; Attendance: 1,700; Referee: Franz Mostböck

22 August 1998	Landstraßer AC Wien	2–8 (a.e.t.)	Austria Klagenfurt	Wien
16:00	Kricanac 53', 59'	Report	Pavicevic 4', 43', 72'; Sleur 15', 42'; Hörmann 35'; Aigner 84', 88'	Stadium: LAC-Platz; Attendance: 250; Referee: Wolfgang Falb

22 August 1998	FC Hard	2–2 (a.e.t.) (3–5 p)	SV Stockerau	Hard
15:30	Milosavljevic 40'; Fuchsbichler 45'	Report	Grujic 2'; Jankai 69'	Attendance: 600; Referee: Thomas Einwaller

22 August 1998	SC Rheindorf Altach	1–1 (a.e.t.) (4–3 p)	FK Austria Wien	Altach
15:30	Gussnig 16' (pen.)	Report	Streiter 45' (pen.); Schmid (yellow card) 112' (red card)	Stadium: Stadion Schnabelholz; Attendance: 2,500; Referee: Konrad Plautz
	Penalties
	Zemanek (penalty scored); Gächter (penalty scored); Uyar (penalty scored); Schöpf (penalty scored)		Šimon (penalty scored); Streiter (penalty scored); Mayrleb (penalty scored); Plassnegger (penalty missed); Pfeffer (penalty missed)

22 August 1998	FC Tulln	2–1	ATSV Sattledt	Tulln
16:00	Schuster 52'; Kellner 60'	Report	Kratschmann 41'	Attendance: 300; Referee: Gerhard Gerstenmayer

22 August 1998	SPG Rum	1–3	SC Bregenz	Rum
15:30	Tomasi 86'	Report	Jani 12'; Gager 54'; Bleyer 74'	Attendance: 200; Referee: Wolfgang Widmann

22 August 1998	SV Bad Schallerbach	1–2	SV Ried	Bad Schallerbach
15:00	Höfer 55'	Report	Śliwowski 18'; Strafner 20'	Attendance: 1,300; Referee: Hannes Birgmann

22 August 1998	SV Horn	4–0	SV Esternberg	Horn
18:00	Jalaksa 37'; Jerabek 45'; Kožiak 75'; Nastl 82'	Report		Attendance: 500; Referee: Thomas Tauzimski

22 August 1998	SV Leibnitz	4–1	EPSV Gmünd	Leibnitz
15:30	Ömer 60', 88', 90'; Cerkic 90+1'	Report	Hauptmann 68'	Attendance: 200; Referee: Fritz Schneeberger

22 August 1998	SV Lendorf	1–6	DSV Leoben	Lendorf
15:30	Thaler 40'	Report	Rosenbichler 4', 7', 84'; Hiden 30'; Dampfhofer 44', 50'	Attendance: 350; Referee: Walter Staudinger

22 August 1998	SV Mattersburg	2–1	FC Tirol Innsbruck	Mattersburg
15:00	Kantauer 56' (yellow card) 83' (red card); Köszegi 73'	Report	Scharrer 21'; Svensson (red card) 58'	Stadium: Pappelstadion; Attendance: 3,000; Referee: Johann Almer

22 August 1998	SV Oberndorf	0–8	Rapid Wien	Oberndorf
15:30		Report	Hatz 26'; Vier 27', 75'; Zingler 36', 38'; Pürk 66', 69'; Penksa 90'	Attendance: 3,500; Referee: Gerald Lehner

22 August 1998	SV Schwechat	3–1	Rapid Lienz	Schwechat
15:30	Michorl 33'; Pokernus 49'; Rumpold 66'	Report	Steurer 4'	Stadium: Rannersdorf; Attendance: 150; Referee: Gernot Reinprecht

22 August 1998	SVG Bleiburg	2–1	SV Grieskirchen	Bleiburg
15:30	Lisic 19' (red card) 90+2'; Miklau 28'	Report	Maier 90+2'	Attendance: 300; Referee: Gottfried Schuiki

22 August 1998	Sturm 19 St. Pölten	3–4	FC Lustenau 07	St. Pölten
16:00	Pranjic 40', 45' (pen.), 85'	Report	Carlos 15', 48', 60'	Attendance: 250; Referee: Raimund Buch

22 August 1998	Union St. Florian	2–1	TSV Hartberg	St. Florian
15:30	Hofmann 44'; Mascherbauer 89'	Report	Zogović 23'	Attendance: 300; Referee: Robert Weber

== Third round ==
The third-round games were played on September 4 – 17, 1998.

Team 1	Score	Team 2
4 September 1998
SC Eisenstadt	1–6	Grazer AK
11 September 1998
SC Untersiebenbrunn	1–3	SC Bregenz
Union St. Florian	2–2 (a.e.t.) (3–4 p)	VfB Admira Wacker Mödling
12 September 1998
ASK Kottingbrunn	0–4	SV Wörgl
Eintracht Wels	0–0 (a.e.t.) (4–5 p)	SV Spittal/Drau
FC Waidhofen/Ybbs	0–2 (a.e.t.)	SV Ried
SC Rheindorf Altach	1–2 (a.e.t.)	SV Braunau
FC Tulln	0–2	FCN St. Pölten
SV Horn	7–1	Austria Klagenfurt
SV Leibnitz	1–3	SC Austria Lustenau
SV Mattersburg	3–5	SK Rapid Wien
SV Schwechat	1–0	First Vienna FC
SV Stockerau	0–2	LASK
SVG Bleiburg	0–5	SV Austria Salzburg
SVG Reichenau	0–5	SK Sturm Graz
13 September 1998
FC Lustenau 07	1–3 (a.e.t.)	DSV Leoben

=== Matches ===
4 September 1998	SC Eisenstadt	1–6	Grazer AK	Eisenstadt
19:30	Leonhardsberger 30'	Report	Kulovits 40'; Ramusch 55'; Golombek 60'; Radovic 74'; Lipa 79'; Drechsel 90'	Stadium: Lindenstadion; Attendance: 800; Referee: Richard Kern

11 September 1998	SC Untersiebenbrunn	1–3	SC Bregenz	Untersiebenbrunn
19:00	Sekerlioglu 11'	Report	Rottensteiner 28'; Gager 39'; Bleyer 42'	Attendance: 900; Referee: Wolfgang Falb

11 September 1998	Union St. Florian	2–2 (a.e.t.) (3–4 p)	FC Admira Wacker Mödling	Sankt Florian
19:00	Obermüller 27' (pen.), 78'	Report	Linimair 6'; Schwellensattl 33'	Stadium: Unionsportplatz; Attendance: 450; Referee: Manfred Krassnitzer

12 September 1998	ASK Kottingbrunn	0–4	SV Wörgl	Kottingbrunn
15:30		Report	Ph. Schwarz 22'; Gaudenzi 24'; Pichler 74'; F. Schwarz 80'	Attendance: 200; Referee: Gottfried Schuiki

12 September 1998	Eintracht Wels	0–0 (a.e.t.) (4–5 p)	SV Spittal/Drau	Wels
15:30		Report		Stadium: Eintracht-Stadion; Attendance: 500; Referee: Franz Schwarzl

12 September 1998	FC Waidhofen/Ybbs	0–2 (a.e.t.)	SV Ried	Waidhofen an der Ybbs
15:00		Report	Strafner 110', 119'	Attendance: 1,500; Referee: Eduard Freunthaller

12 September 1998	SC Rheindorf Altach	1–2 (a.e.t.)	SV Braunau	Altach
15:00	Gussnig 76'; Guem (red card) 117'	Report	Planötscher 59'; Micheu 108'; Toth (red card) 72'	Stadium: Stadion Schnabelholz; Attendance: 1,400; Referee: Michael Daxauer

12 September 1998	FC Tulln	0–2	FCN St. Pölten	Tulln an der Donau
15:30		Report	Zvijerac 22'; Skokan 82'	Attendance: 1,000; Referee: Ewald Hammer

12 September 1998	SV Horn	7–1	Austria Klagenfurt	Horn
19:00	Kožiak 1'; Jalaska 46', 63', 66'; Helm 57'; Demjanovic 73'; Zelinsky 78'	Report	Sleur 43'; Mijic (red card) 53'	Attendance: 800; Referee: Franz Maislinger

12 September 1998	SV Leibnitz	1–3	SC Austria Lustenau	Wagna
15:00	Pucher 81'; Kargl (red card)	Report	Regtop 54', 60', 72'	Stadium: Römerstadion; Attendance: 1,000; Referee: Wolfgang Smole

12 September 1998	SV Mattersburg	3–5	SK Rapid Wien	Mattersburg
15:30	Köszegi 26', 29'; Mörz 50'; Kühbauer (yellow card) 48' (red card) 67'	Report	Vier 7'; Prosenik 24'; Heraf 45'; Ratajczyk 73', 90'	Stadium: Pappelstadion; Attendance: 8,200; Referee: Manfred Schüttengruber

12 September 1998	SV Schwechat	1–0	First Vienna FC	Schwechat
19:30	Weber 58'	Report		Stadium: Rannersdorf; Attendance: 300; Referee: Franz Mostböck

12 September 1998	SV Stockerau	0–2	LASK	Stockerau
15:30		Report	Frigård 13'; Dadi 64'	Stadium: Alte Au; Attendance: 1,000; Referee: Robert Sedlacek

12 September 1998	SVG Bleiburg	0–5	SV Austria Salzburg	Bleiburg
15:00		Report	Ibertsberger 48'; Glieder 57'; Sabitzer 82'; Koejoe 87'; Nikolic 90'	Attendance: 2,000; Referee: Johann Almer

12 September 1998	SVG Reichenau	0–5	SK Sturm Graz	Innsbruck
15:30		Report	Reinmayr 11', 13'; Spielmann 52' (pen.); Minavand 57'; Popović 74'	Stadium: Tivoli; Attendance: 2,000; Referee: Gerald Lehner

13 September 1998	FC Lustenau 07	1–3 (a.e.t.)	DSV Leoben	Lustenau
10:15	Orie 76' (pen.); Luiz Carlos (yellow card) 32' (red card)	Report	Dubajic 78'; Dötsch 99'; Fladerer 114'; Skrivanek (yellow card) 30' (red card)	Attendance: 600; Referee: Bernhard Brugger

== Fourth round ==
The fourth-round games were played on October 31, 1998.

Team 1	Score	Team 2
31 October 1998
SC Austria Lustenau	3–1 (a.e.t.)	DSV Leoben
FCN St. Pölten	0–4	Grazer AK
SK Rapid Wien	3–0	SV Wörgl
SV Horn	0–3	SV Ried
SV Schwechat	0–4	SV Braunau
SV Spittal/Drau	0–1	LASK
SK Sturm Graz	2–1	SC Bregenz
VfB Admira Wacker Mödling	2–2 (a.e.t.) (2–4 p)	SV Austria Salzburg

=== Matches ===
31 October 1998	SC Austria Lustenau	3–1 (a.e.t.)	DSV Leoben	Lustenau
15:30	Regtop 73', 102'; Vujic 117'	Report	Fladerer 90+3'	Stadium: Reichshofstadion; Attendance: 2,600; Referee: Michael Daxauer

31 October 1998	FCN St. Pölten	0–4	Grazer AK	Sankt Pölten
15:30		Report	Golombek 53'; Luhový 58', 63', 89'	Stadium: Voith-Platz; Attendance: 3,300; Referee: Wolfgang Sowa

31 October 1998	SK Rapid Wien	3–0	SV Wörgl	Vienna
15:30	Wagner 15'; Adžić 26' (pen.); Wimmer 71'	Report	Baumgartner (red card) 24'	Stadium: Gerhard Hanappi Stadium; Attendance: 3,500; Referee: Thomas Steiner

31 October 1998	SV Horn	0–3	SV Ried	Horn
19:00		Report	Strafner 9', 22'; Brunmayr 11'	Attendance: 3,500; Referee: Johann Liebert

31 October 1998	SV Schwechat	0–4	SV Braunau	Schwechat
15:00		Report	Hoffmann 8', 78'; Kraiger 50', 66'	Stadium: Reichshofstadion; Attendance: 300; Referee: Wolfgang Falb

31 October 1998	SV Spittal/Drau	0–1	LASK	Spittal an der Drau
15:00		Report	Dadi 90+1'	Stadium: Goldeck-Stadion; Attendance: 1,600; Referee: Stefan Meßner

31 October 1998	SK Sturm Graz	2–1	SC Bregenz	Graz
15:30	Schopp 15' (yellow card) 23' (red card) 88'; Reinmayr 90'; Babalade (red card) 85'	Report	Stojanovic 5'	Stadium: Arnold Schwarzenegger Stadion; Attendance: 5,000; Referee: Wolfgang Smole

31 October 1998	FC Admira Wacker Mödling	2–2 (a.e.t.) (2–4 p)	Austria Salzburg	Mödling
15:30	Linimair 59', 89'; Graf (red card) 66'	Report	Glieder 53'; Pfeifenberger 54'	Stadium: Stadion Mödling; Attendance: 1,500; Referee: Karl Finzinger
	Penalties
	Linimair (penalty scored); Kartalija (penalty scored); Binder (penalty missed); Fellner (penalty missed)		Glieder (penalty missed); Hütter (penalty scored); Aigner (penalty scored); Laeßig (penalty scored); Jurčević (penalty scored)

== Quarter-finals ==
The games were played on April 6, 1999.

Team 1	Score	Team 2
6 April 1999
SC Austria Lustenau	0–1	LASK
Grazer AK	1–2	SK Sturm Graz
SK Rapid Wien	4–1	SV Austria Salzburg
SV Braunau	0–1	SV Ried

=== Matches ===
6 April 1999	SC Austria Lustenau	0–1	LASK	Lustenau
19:00		Report	Pichorner 27'	Stadium: Reichshofstadion; Attendance: 5,000; Referee: Erwin Hänsel

6 April 1999	Grazer AK	1–2	SK Sturm Graz	Graz
20:30	Lipa 16'; Sick (yellow card) 49' (red card) 86'	Report	Vastić 65' (pen.); Martens 72'	Stadium: Arnold Schwarzenegger Stadion; Attendance: 7,250; Referee: Wolfgang Sowa

6 April 1999	SK Rapid Wien	4–1	SV Austria Salzburg	Vienna
20:30	Vier 1'; Adžić 14', 63'; Wagner 78'	Report	Kitzbichler 74'	Stadium: Gerhard Hanappi Stadium; Attendance: 8,500; Referee: Konrad Plautz

6 April 1999	SV Braunau	0–1	SV Ried	Braunau
19:00		Report	Aničić 9'	Stadium: Grenzlandstadion; Attendance: 4,000; Referee: Dietmar Drabek

== Semi-finals ==
The games were played on May 5, 1999.

Team 1	Score	Team 2
5 May 1999
SK Sturm Graz	5–0	SV Ried
SK Rapid Wien	0–2	LASK

=== Matches ===
5 May 1999	SK Rapid Wien	0–2	LASK	Vienna
20:30		Report	Panis 5'; Stumpf 78'; Mehlem (yellow card) 80' (red card) 84'	Stadium: Gerhard Hanappi Stadium; Attendance: 6,000; Referee: Günter Benkö

5 May 1999	SK Sturm Graz	5–0	SV Ried	Graz
19:00	Kocijan 4'; Minavand 7'; Vastić 45'; Schopp 55'; Prilasnig 88'	Report		Stadium: Arnold Schwarzenegger Stadion; Attendance: 6,000; Referee: Robert Sedlacek

== Final ==
=== Details ===
18 May 1999
20:30

Sturm Graz	1–1 (a.e.t.)	LASK
Haas 60'	Report	Vastić 36' (o.g.)
Penalties
Vastić (penalty scored); Haas (penalty scored); Schupp (penalty scored); Foda (penalty scored)	4–2	(penalty missed) Kauz; (penalty missed) Rohseano; (penalty scored) Weissenberger; (penalty scored) Stumpf

Ernst-Happel-Stadion, Vienna
Attendance: 8,500
Referee: Robert Sedlacek

GK	(Poland) Kazimierz Sidorczuk
DF	(Germany) Franco Foda
DF	(Austria) Günther Neukirchner	(yellow card) 90'
DF	(Federal Republic of Yugoslavia) Ranko Popović	(yellow card) 30'
DF	(Iran) Mehrdad Minavand		(substituted off) 97'
MF	(Austria) Roman Mählich
MF	(Belgium) Jan-Pieter Martens		(substituted off) 105'
MF	(Austria) Hannes Reinmayr	(yellow card) 45'	(substituted off) 110'
MF	(Austria) Markus Schupp
FW	(Austria) Mario Haas
FW	(Austria) Ivica Vastić
Substitutes:
DF	(Germany) Michael Bochtler		(substituted on) 97'
FW	(Moldova) Victor Berco		(substituted on) 105'
DF	(Slovenia) Darko Milanič		(substituted on) 110'
Manager:
(Bosnia and Herzegovina) Ivica Osim

GK	(Croatia) Željko Pavlović
DF	(Senegal) Cheikh Sidy Ba		(substituted off) 56'
DF	(Slovenia) Željko Milinovič	(yellow card) 28'
DF	(Austria) Bernhard Muhr
DF	(Austria) Klaus Rohseano
MF	(South Africa) Brendan Augustine		(substituted off) 63'
MF	(Austria) Herbert Grassler
MF	(Austria) Jürgen Kauz
MF	(Austria) Jürgen Panis
MF	(Austria) Jürgen Pichorner	(yellow card) 17'
FW	(Ivory Coast) Eugène Dadi		(substituted off) 93'
Substitutes:
MF	(Austria) Michael Mehlem		(substituted on) 56'
MF	(Austria) Markus Weissenberger		(substituted on) 63'
FW	(Austria) Christian Stumpf		(substituted on) 93'
Manager:
(Croatia) Marinko Koljanin

Match rules

- 90 minutes.
- 30 minutes of extra-time if necessary.
- Penalty shootout if scores still level.
