= Gilbert Prilasnig =

Austrian footballer

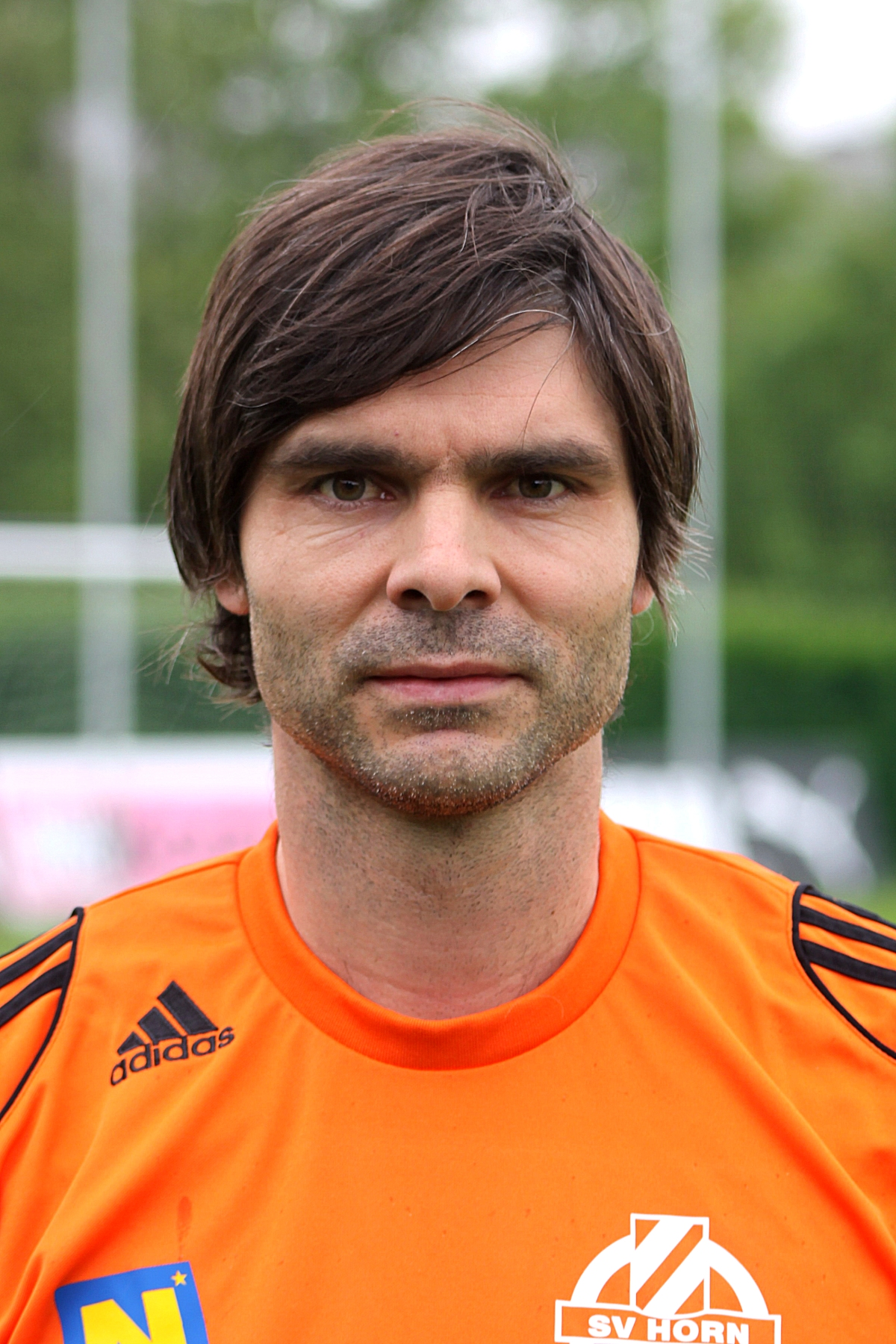

Personal information
- Date of birth: 1 April 1973 (age 53)
- Place of birth: Klagenfurt, Austria
- Height: 1.83 m (6 ft 0 in)
- Position: Defender

Youth career
- 1985–1991: VST Völkermarkt

Senior career*
Years	Team	Apps	(Gls)
1991–2001	Sturm Graz	209	(20)
2001–2002	Aris Thessaloniki	15	(0)
2002–2003	FC Kärnten	5	(0)
2004	DSV Leoben		
2005–2007	Miedź Legnica	49	(2)
2007	SV Horn	6	(0)
2007–2010	SC Wiesfleck	81	(3)

International career
1995	Austria U21	2	(0)
1997–2000	Austria	16	(0)

Managerial career
- 2010–2024: Sturm Graz Jugend (sporting director)
- * Club domestic league appearances and goals

Gilbert Prilasnig (born 1 April 1973) is an Austrian former professional footballer who is currently the sporting director for Sturm Graz Jugend.

== Honours ==
Sturm Graz

- Austrian Football Bundesliga: 1997–98, 1998–99
- Austrian Cup: 1995–96, 1996–97, 1998–99
- Austrian Supercup: 1998, 1999
