= Kazimierz Sidorczuk =

Polish footballer

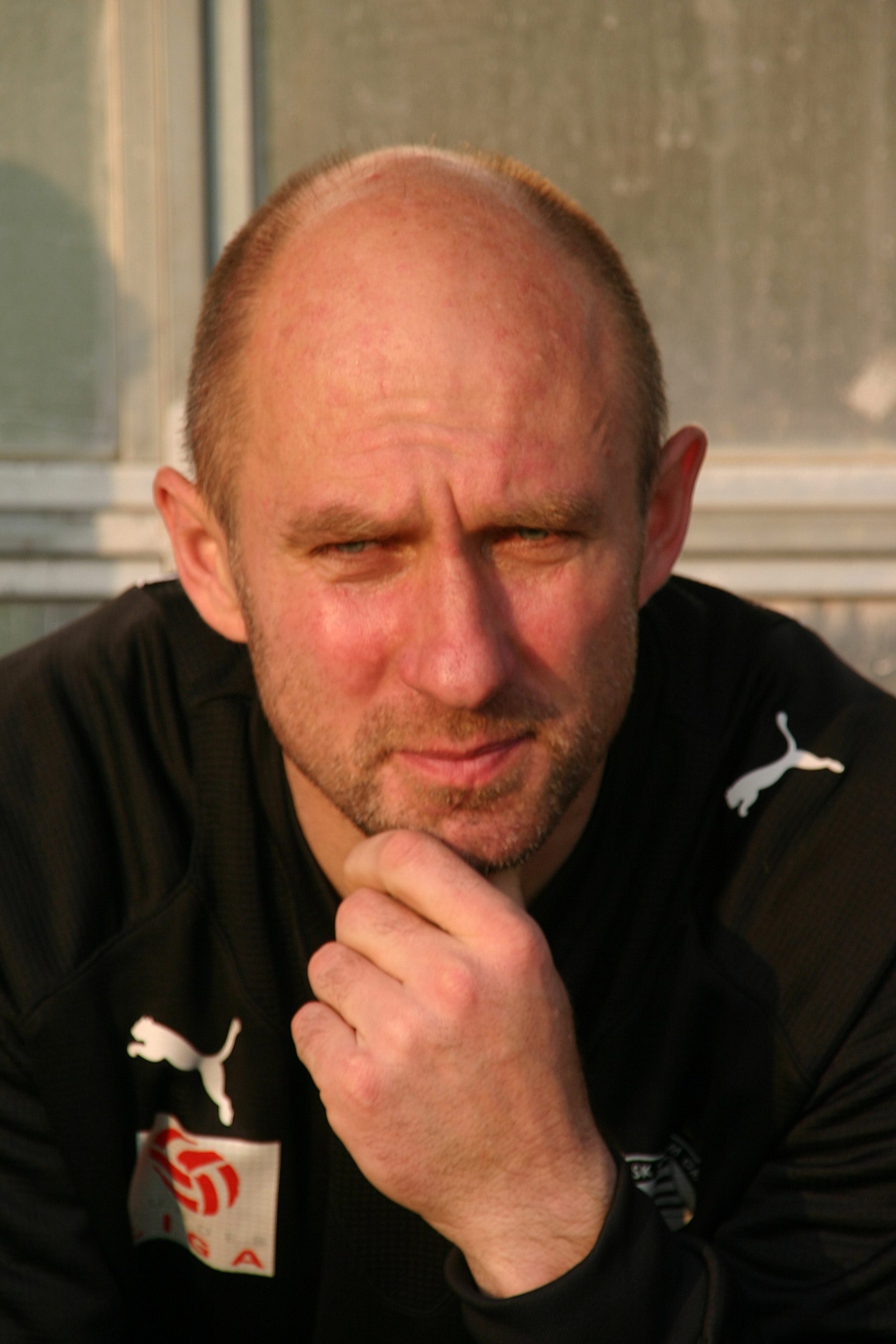

Personal information
- Date of birth: 4 March 1967 (age 59)
- Place of birth: Szczecin, Poland
- Height: 1.88 m (6 ft 2 in)
- Position: Goalkeeper

Team information
- Current team: United FC (goalkeeping coach)

Senior career*
Years	Team	Apps	(Gls)
–1985	Dąb Dębno		
1985–1989	Celuloza Kostrzyn nad Odrą		
1989–1993	Lech Poznań	115	(0)
1993–1994	Sokół Pniewy	5	(0)
1994	Zagłębie Lubin	9	(0)
1994–1995	Warta Poznań	11	(0)
1995	Petrochemia Płock	17	(0)
1995–1997	Stomil Olsztyn	48	(0)
1997–2002	Sturm Graz	140	(0)
2002–2006	Kapfenberger SV	100	(1)

International career
1990–1999	Poland	14	(0)

Managerial career
- 2006–2014: Sturm Graz (goalkeeping coach)
- 2018–2019: Wildon (goalkeeping coach)
- 2022–2023: Gleinstätten (goalkeeping coach)
- 2023–: United FC (goalkeeping coach)
- * Club domestic league appearances and goals

Kazimierz Sidorczuk (born 4 March 1967) is a Polish former professional footballer who played as a goalkeeper, spending most of his career in Lech Poznań and Austria. He finished his career in Kapfenberger SV, for whom he once scored a goal.

He played for Poland 14 times.

== Honours ==
Lech Poznań

- Ekstraklasa: 1989–90, 1991–92, 1992–93
- Polish Super Cup: 1990, 1992

Sturm Graz

- Austrian Bundesliga: 1997–98, 1998–99
- Austrian Cup: 1996–97, 1998–99

Individual

- Polish Newcomer of the Year: 1990
