= Ferdinand Feldhofer =

Austrian former footballer

Personal information
- Date of birth: 23 October 1979 (age 47)
- Place of birth: Vorau, Austria
- Height: 1.84 m (6 ft 0 in)
- Position: Defender

Youth career
- TuS Vorau
- TSV Pöllau

Senior career*
Years	Team	Apps	(Gls)
1998–2002	Sturm Graz	32	(1)
2002–2005	Rapid Wien	80	(5)
2005–2008	Wacker Innsbruck	77	(4)
2008–2013	Sturm Graz	88	(2)

International career
2002–2007	Austria	13	(1)

Managerial career
- 2015–2019: SV Lafnitz
- 2019–2021: Wolfsberger AC
- 2021–2022: SK Rapid Wien
- 2024: Dinamo Tbilisi
- 2024–2025: Cercle Brugge
- 2025–2026: Grazer AK
- * Club domestic league appearances and goals

Ferdinand Feldhofer (born 23 October 1979) is an Austrian football coach and a former player.

== Career ==
=== Club ===
Feldhofer started his career as a youth player with TuS Vorau and TSV Pöllau in Styria before joining Sturm Graz with whom he won the double in 1999. He moved on a free to Rapid Wien in 2002, after refusing to extend his deal with Sturm and making the way to court because he was subsequently put back in Sturm's amateur side, Feldhofer ended up winning the case. He clinched another league title with Rapid in 2005 and then left to become skipper of Wacker Innsbruck. In summer 2008 he decided to return to Sturm, where he signed a 3-year contract.

=== National team ===
He made his debut for Austria in a March 2002 friendly match against Slovakia and went on to earn 13 caps scoring one goal in a friendly against Trinidad and Tobago in Vienna. His last international was a March 2007 friendly match against Ghana. He was not considered for Austria's Euro 2008 squad.

== Managerial career ==
After acquiring his UEFA A Licence in June 2012, Feldhofer was a group manager at the "LAZ Weiz" in Weiz from 2013-2014. After that, from 2014 to 2015, he was working as an individual trainer for the ÖFB at the LAZ Styria. On the 10th of October, Feldhofer was revealed as manager of Austrian Regionalliga club SV Lafnitz and two days later started his work there. He was able to win the Austrian Regionalliga Central with the club, getting promoted to the Austrian 2. Liga by doing so. In October 2019, Feldhofer acquired his UEFA Pro Licence, the highest of Coach licences which is required in order to coach professional teams.

In December 2019, Feldhofer became coach of Austrian Bundesliga club Wolfsberger AC. Under him, the club was able to record what probably were the biggest achievements in the history of the club to date. At the end of the 2019/20 season, the Wolfsberger club stood at third place, which was the best season result in the history of the club, with this they were also able to immediately qualify for the Europa League for the second time. In 2020/21, the club was able to pass the group stage of said competition for the first time in club history but their run was put to a halt after two ties against Tottenham Hotspur. In the league however, the club was struggling to find continuous wins as they were, among other problems, missing a goalscorer of high caliber with Shon Weissman having departed to Real Valladolid. These smaller problems were however put in the background after it became public that Feldhofer had seemingly repeatedly been having fights with club skipper Michael Liendl putting him on the bench a few times before finally leaving him, together with two other leading players Michael Novak and Christopher Wernitznig, out of the match-day squad before their cup-clash against LASK, the game ended in a 0-1 loss after added time and Feldhofer decided to step down from his role as club-coach the following day, leaving the club at fifth in the table.

Since 28 November 2021, Feldhofer managed Austrian club SK Rapid Wien. Feldhofer was fired by Rapid on 16 October 2022.

On 16 June 2024, he was appointed as the manager of Georgian club Dinamo Tbilisi signing a year and a half contract. On 10 December 2024, Dinamo Tbilisi announced the departure of Feldhofer as Head Coach by mutual agreement.

On the same day, Feldhofer was announced as the new head coach of Cercle Brugge on a six months contract, with an option for 2025-26 season. On 17 March 2025, Feldhofer was sacked by Cercle Brugge after failing to guide the club away from the relegation play-offs.

On 24 March 2025, Feldhofer was announced as the new head coach of Grazer AK. He was fired on 17 August 2026, following a 0–8 loss to Rapid Wien.

== Managerial statistics ==
As of match played 17 August 2026

Managerial record by team and tenure
Team	Nation	From	To	Record					Ref
Team	Nation	From	To	G	W	D	L	Win %	Ref
SV Lafnitz	(Austria)	10 October 2015	23 December 2019	132	66	34	32	50.00	
Wolfsberger AC	(Austria)	23 December 2019	4 March 2021	46	20	10	16	43.48	
Rapid Wien	(Austria)	29 November 2021	16 October 2022	42	17	11	14	40.48	
Dinamo Tbilisi	(Georgia (country))	16 June 2024	10 December 2024	25	8	6	11	32.00	
Cercle Brugge	(Belgium)	10 December 2024	17 March 2025	14	3	8	3	21.43	
Grazer AK	(Austria)	24 March 2025	17 August 2026	46	13	16	17	28.26	
Total				305	127	85	93	41.64	—

== Honours ==
=== As player ===
- Austrian Football Bundesliga: 1997-98, 1998–99, 2010-11 (Sturm Graz) and 2004–05 (Rapid Vienna)
- Austrian Cup: 1998–99, 2009–10 (Sturm Graz)

=== As coach ===
- Austrian Regionalliga Central: 2017-18 (SV Lafnitz)
