= Ranko Popović =

Serbian football manager and player

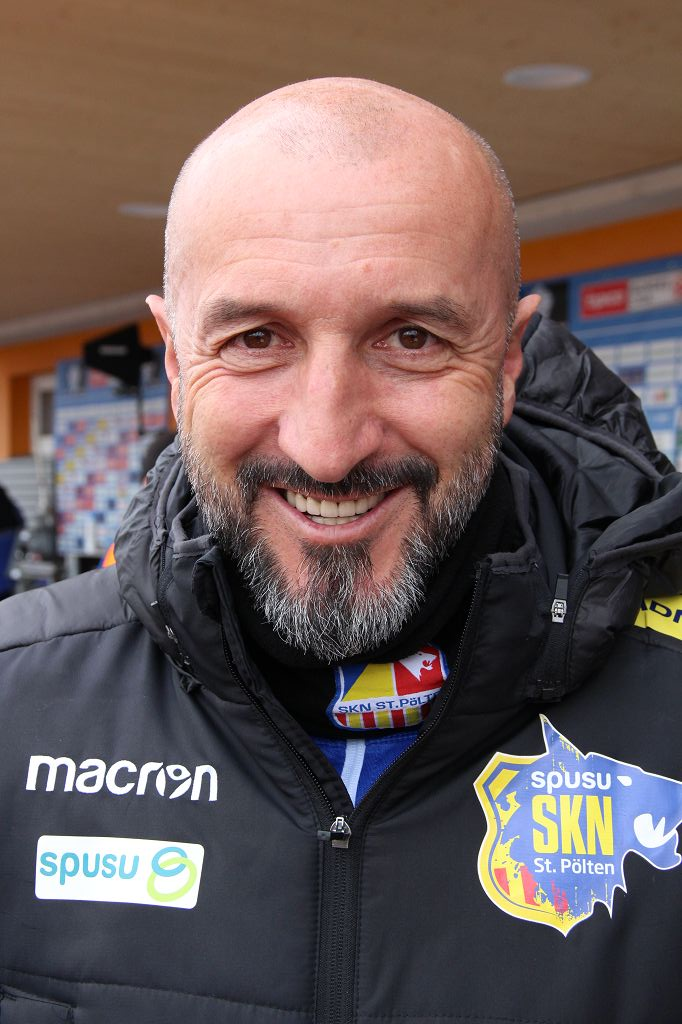
- Popović with St. Pölten in 2019

Personal information
- Full name: Ranko Popović
- Date of birth: 26 June 1967 (age 59)
- Place of birth: Peć, SR Serbia, SFR Yugoslavia
- Height: 1.83 m (6 ft 0 in)
- Position: Defender

Team information
- Current team: Kyoto Sanga (manager)

Youth career
- Budućnost Peć

Senior career*
Years	Team	Apps	(Gls)
198x–198x	Kneževac		
1988–1989	Beograd		
1989–1991	Partizan	2	(0)
1989–1990	→ Leotar (loan)	13	(0)
1992–1994	Spartak Subotica	58	(11)
1994	Ethnikos Piraeus	10	(0)
1995	Spartak Subotica	14	(2)
1995–1997	Almería	16	(0)
1997–2001	Sturm Graz	74	(9)
2002–2004	TuS Arnfels	25+	(6+)
2004–2006	Pachern	25+	(4+)
Total		237+	(32+)

Managerial career
- 2002–2004: TuS Arnfels
- 2004–2006: Pachern
- 2008: Horgoš
- 2008–2009: Spartak Subotica
- 2009: Oita Trinita
- 2011: Machida Zelvia
- 2012–2013: FC Tokyo
- 2014: Cerezo Osaka
- 2014–2015: Zaragoza
- 2016–2017: Buriram United
- 2017–2018: Pune City
- 2018–2019: St. Pölten
- 2020–2022: Machida Zelvia
- 2023: Vojvodina
- 2024: Kashima Antlers
- 2026–: Kyoto Sanga
- * Club domestic league appearances and goals

Ranko Popović (Serbian Cyrillic: Ранко Поповић; born 26 June 1967) is a Serbian professional football manager and former player who is currently the manager of J1 League club Kyoto Sanga.

== Playing career ==
Born in Peć, SAP Kosovo, SR Serbia, Popović started out at local club Budućnost. He moved to Belgrade in 1985 due to compulsory military service and played for Kneževac in the Belgrade Zone League. In the 1988–89 season, Popović played for fellow Belgrade Zone League club Beograd.

In the summer of 1989, Popović was acquired by Yugoslav First League side Partizan. He was later loaned to Yugoslav Second League club Leotar during the 1989–90 season. After returning to Partizan, Popović made two appearances in the 1990–91 Yugoslav First League.

In 1992, Popović switched to Spartak Subotica. He spent two and a half years there, before moving abroad to Greece and joining Ethnikos Piraeus in the summer of 1994. Six months later, Popović returned to Spartak Subotica until the end of the season.

After playing for two years at Segunda División club Almería, Popović joined Austrian side Sturm Graz in the summer of 1997, aged 30. He spent the next four seasons with the club, winning back-to-back championships in 1998 and 1999. In addition, Popović made 11 appearances in the UEFA Champions League.

== Managerial career ==
=== Austria and Japan ===
Between 2002 and 2006, Popović served as player-manager of Austrian lower league sides TuS Arnfels and Pachern. He subsequently moved to Japan in the summer of 2006, assisting his compatriot Mihailo Petrović at Sanfrecce Hiroshima for over a year.

=== Serbia ===
In early 2008, Popović returned to his homeland to take charge of Serbian League Vojvodina club Zlatibor Voda. He led them to promotion to the Serbian First League, before they merged with Spartak Subotica. In May 2009, Popović was replaced by Slavko Vojičić.

=== Return to Japan ===
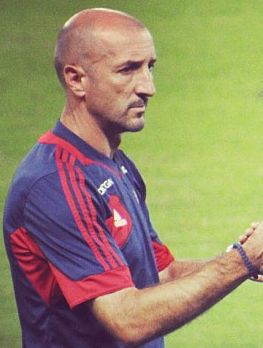
Popović with FC Tokyo in 2012

In July 2009, Popović accepted an offer to coach J League club Oita Trinita, which had experienced 14 consecutive defeats in the season. In his first six matches, the team only won once, but in the last 10 matches of the season, it did not lose once (five wins and five draws). This result earned him an offer to coach the team for the next season, but the team nearly went bankrupt and his contract had to be canceled.

In December 2010, Popović was appointed manager of Machida Zelvia. He subsequently went on to become manager of some of the most recognized clubs in Japan, including FC Tokyo and Cerezo Osaka.

=== Spain ===
On 24 November 2014, Popović was appointed at the helm of Spanish Segunda División side Zaragoza, replacing the fired Víctor Muñoz. He led the team to the 2015 Segunda División play-offs, but fell short, losing to Las Palmas on the away goals rule. While at Zaragoza, Popović was named the Segunda División Manager of the Month by the LFP in October 2015. He was dismissed on 20 December 2015, after a 3–1 loss against Gimnàstic.

=== Thailand and India ===
In August 2016, Thai League club Buriram United appointed Popović as the club manager to fill the vacant role after the dismissal of Afshin Ghotbi. He left the position in June 2017 after receiving a three-month ban by the Thai FA (FAT) for slapping his team's physio after a league game earlier that month.

In September 2017, Indian Super League side Pune City appointed Popović as new manager. He parted ways with the club in May 2018.

=== Vojvodina ===
On 11 August 2023, After spending three seasons in Machida Zelvia, Popović took over Serbian SuperLiga club Vojvodina, signing a deal until the end of the season 2023–24.

=== Kashima Antlers ===
On 21 December 2023, after a brief half-season at Vojvodina, Popović joined J1 League club Kashima Antlers. Popović has some mixed results at the start of the season but an 11 game unbeaten streak in the middle of the season saw Kashima solidly in the top 3 of the league. However, results started to drop off and in spite of a 4–0 league victory over Albirex Niigata, Popović was dismissed with Antlers sitting in 4th in the table and only 6 games left in the season.

=== Kyoto Sanga ===
Following the departure of Cho Kwi-jae, Popović was announced as the manager of J1 League club Kyoto Sanga in June 2026, ahead of the 2026–27 J1 League season.

== Personal life ==
Popović also holds Austrian citizenship.

== Managerial statistics ==
As of 6 October 2024

Managerial record by team and tenure
Team	Nat.	From	To	Record				
Team	Nat.	From	To	G	W	D	L	Win %
Horgoš	(Serbia)	1 January 2008	31 June 2008	16	11	3	2	68.75
Spartak Subotica	(Serbia)	1 July 2008	30 June 2009	24	10	7	7	41.67
Oita Trinita	(Japan)	21 July 2009	31 January 2010	16	6	5	5	37.50
Machida Zelvia	(Japan)	1 February 2011	31 January 2012	35	19	7	9	54.29
FC Tokyo	(Japan)	1 February 2012	31 January 2014	78	34	16	28	43.59
Cerezo Osaka	(Japan)	1 February 2014	9 June 2014	13	4	4	5	30.77
Real Zaragoza	(Spain)	24 November 2014	21 December 2015	51	19	17	15	37.25
Buriram United	(Thailand)	25 August 2017	13 June 2017	19	12	4	3	63.16
Pune City	(India)	25 September 2017	31 May 2018	21	9	4	8	42.86
St. Pölten	(Austria)	10 October 2018	13 June 2019	24	4	6	14	16.67
Machida Zelvia	(Japan)	1 February 2020	31 January 2023	127	46	34	47	36.22
Vojvodina	(Serbia)	10 August 2023	23 December 2023	19	10	4	5	52.63
Kashima Antlers	(Japan)	1 February 2024	6 October 2024	38	19	8	11	50.00
Career Total				481	203	119	159	42.20

== Honours ==
=== Player ===
Sturm Graz

- Austrian Bundesliga: 1997–98, 1998–99
- Austrian Cup: 1998–99
- Austrian Supercup: 1998, 1999

=== Manager ===
Zlatibor Voda

- Serbian League Vojvodina: 2007–08

Buriram United

- Thai League Cup: 2016
- Mekong Club Championship: 2016
