= Darko Milanič =

Slovenian footballer and manager (born 1967)

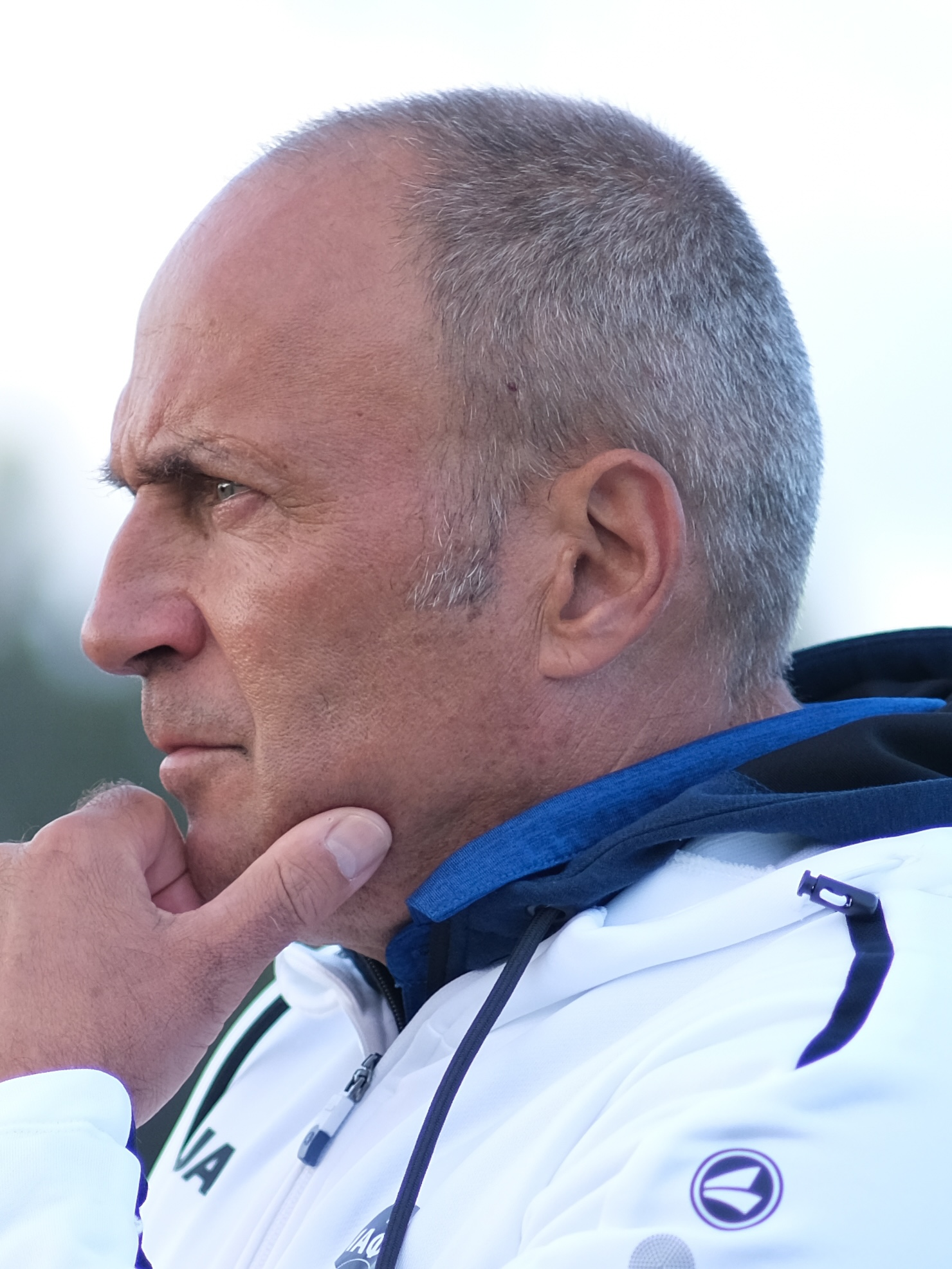
- Milanič as Pafos manager in 2021

Personal information
- Date of birth: 18 December 1967 (age 58)
- Place of birth: Izola, SR Slovenia, Yugoslavia
- Height: 1.84 m (6 ft 0 in)
- Position: Defender

Team information
- Current team: Maribor (head coach)

Youth career
- Izola

Senior career*
Years	Team	Apps	(Gls)
- Izola
1986–1993	Partizan	104	(2)
1993–2000	Sturm Graz	189	(9)
Total		293	(11)

International career
1991–1992	Yugoslavia	5	(0)
1992–2000	Slovenia	42	(0)

Managerial career
- 2004–2006: Primorje
- 2007–2008: Gorica
- 2008–2013: Maribor
- 2013–2014: Sturm Graz
- 2014: Leeds United
- 2016–2020: Maribor
- 2020–2021: Slovan Bratislava
- 2021–2022: Pafos
- 2022: Anorthosis Famagusta
- 2023–2024: Baniyas
- 2024–2025: Al Wahda
- 2026: Al Wahda
- 2026–: Maribor
- * Club domestic league appearances and goals

Darko Milanič (born 18 December 1967) is a Slovenian professional football manager and former player who is the manager of Slovenian PrvaLiga club Maribor.

As a player, Milanič represented both Yugoslavia and Slovenia at international level. He also captained Slovenia at UEFA Euro 2000.

== Club career ==
Born in Izola, Milanič began his football career with local side NK Izola. In the 1986–87 season, he joined Partizan. During his time at Partizan, he won the Yugoslav First League and the Yugoslav Cup twice.

After the 1992–93 season, Milanič moved to the Austrian side Sturm Graz, where he played for eight seasons and won eight trophies, including two Austrian Bundesliga titles, three Austrian Cups and three Austrian Supercups.

In 2000, at the age of 32, Milanič retired early due to injury and to pursue a coaching career in football.

== International career ==
During his spell at Serbian club Partizan, Milanič earned five caps for Yugoslavia. Even after Slovenia's independence, he was included by Yugoslavia in their squad for Euro 1992, but the nation would be suspended due to the Yugoslav Wars.

Milanič later represented Slovenia, earning 42 caps. He captained his country at Euro 2000, including a match against his former national team, Yugoslavia, which ended in a 3–3 draw.

== Coaching career ==
After his football career, Milanič turned to coaching. He started his coaching career at his hometown club Izola. After that, he was appointed manager of Primorje and an assistant coach at Sturm Graz under Franco Foda during the 2006–07 season.

=== Gorica ===
At the start of the 2007–08 season, Milanič was appointed as the head coach of Gorica, where he helped guide them to a third-place finish in the Slovenian PrvaLiga. In the 2007–08 UEFA Cup, the team was knocked out in the first qualifying round after losing over two legs to Rabotnički.

=== Maribor ===
On 29 May 2008, Milanič was appointed head coach at Maribor by Director of Football Zlatko Zahovič. He won the Slovenian PrvaLiga during his first year in the 2008–09 season. In May 2010, Maribor won the Slovenian Cup. After winning this trophy, Milanič became the first coach that have won all three domestic trophies in Slovenian club football, having won the Slovenian League and the Slovenian Supercup before that. He has achieved that in only two seasons.

At the beginning of the 2012–13 season, Maribor played in their fourth successive Supercup. The club defeated their "eternal rivals" Olimpija Ljubljana 2–1 to clinch their second Supercup title. In January 2013, Milanič was selected as the Slovenian Manager of the Year for 2012 by winning the league, cup and supercup.

Milanič led Maribor to the group stages of the 2012–13 UEFA Europa League as one of the losers in the play-off round of the 2012–13 UEFA Champions League, where they were eliminated by Dinamo Zagreb. This was the second season in a row in which Maribor qualified to the Europa League main stages. They managed to get four points out of six matches, defeating Panathinaikos and drawing with Tottenham Hotspur, both at home. On 9 November 2012, Maribor suffered a 3–1 defeat to Tottenham Hotspur after a hat-trick by Jermain Defoe. In the final game of Group J, Maribor suffered a 4–1 defeat to Lazio.

Maribor confirmed their eleventh league title on 11 May 2013 after defeating Olimpija Ljubljana 2–1. In the 2013 Cup Final, Maribor defeated Celje 1–0, thus securing their fourth "double" in the club's history.

=== Sturm Graz ===
On 4 June 2013, Milanič became a manager of Sturm Graz in the Austrian Bundesliga, with Novica Nikčević as his assistant. One of his first signings was Robert Berić, whom he signed from his former club, Maribor. Sturm Graz were knocked out of the Europa League after losing 1–0 on aggregate in the second qualifying round to Breiðablik UBK. He led his side to a fifth-place finish during his first season during the 2013–14 season.

On 21 September 2014, during a press conference, Sturm Graz revealed that Milanič would be leaving the club to join an English side Leeds United after agreeing to buy out his contract at Sturm Graz to make the move.

=== Leeds United ===
On 23 September 2014, Milanič was appointed as manager of Leeds United on a two-year deal, replacing Dave Hockaday. He was joined at Leeds by his Sturm Graz assistant Novica Nikčević. Milanič parted company on 25 October 2014, minutes after a 2–1 loss to Wolverhampton Wanderers, just 32 days after taking over, for failing to win any of his six games in charge.

=== Return to Maribor ===
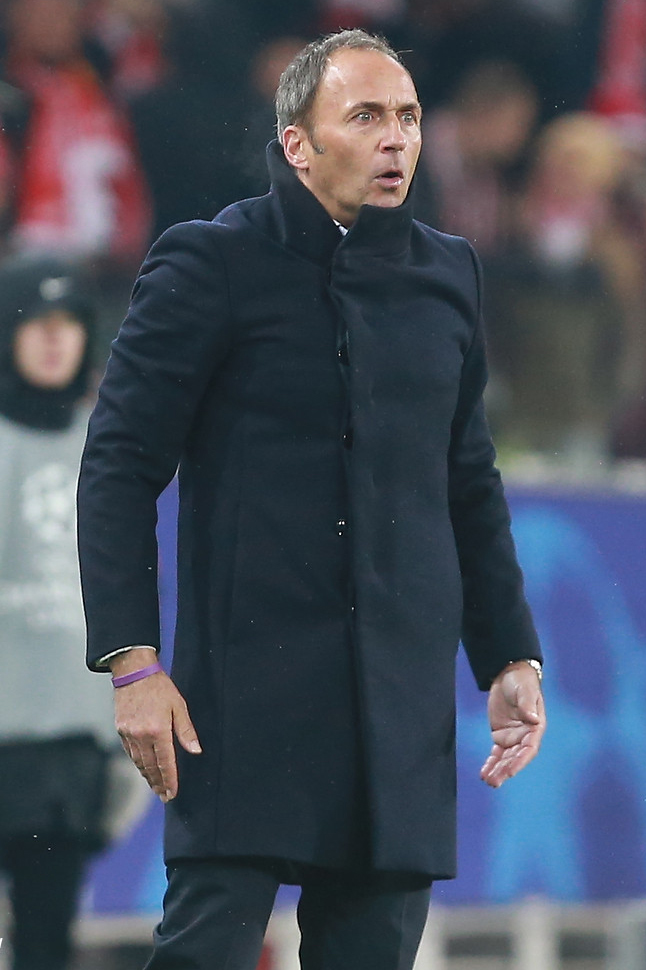
Milanič managing Maribor in 2017

On 2 March 2016, Milanič returned to the Slovenian PrvaLiga club Maribor. He became the Slovenian champion with the team in the 2016–17 season. Milanič led Maribor to the group stages of the 2017–18 UEFA Champions League after eliminating Zrinjski Mostar, Fimleikafélag Hafnarfjarðar, and Hapoel Be'er-Sheva in the qualifying rounds. In the 2018–19 season, he won his sixth league title with Maribor. He resigned in March 2020 after a 2–1 home defeat against Bravo.

=== Slovan Bratislava ===
On 7 September 2020, Milanič took charge of Slovak club Slovan Bratislava, signing a one-year contract with an option for further two years, with Novica Nikčević named as his assistant. He was sacked on 9 May 2021 after a series of poor results, despite reaching the cup final and topping the league table.

=== Pafos ===
On 30 June 2021, Milanič was appointed as head coach of Pafos on a two-year contract. He was sacked on 10 May 2022 after a 1–0 defeat against Anorthosis Famagusta, one round before the end of the season.

=== Anorthosis Famagusta ===
On 22 June 2022, he signed a two-year contract with Cypriot First Division club Anorthosis Famagusta. He was sacked on 3 October after managing just five games.

=== Baniyas Club ===
On 8 June 2023, Milanič signed a one-year contract with the UAE Pro League side Baniyas for the 2023–24 season.

== Managerial statistics ==
As of 11 June 2024

Managerial record by team and tenure
Team	From	To	Record				
Team	From	To	G	W	D	L	Win %
Primorje	15 June 2004	12 April 2006	63	24	15	24	38.10
Gorica	6 June 2007	27 May 2008	38	15	9	14	39.47
Maribor	29 May 2008	3 June 2013	248	138	61	49	55.65
Sturm Graz	4 June 2013	22 September 2014	53	21	12	20	39.62
Leeds United	23 September 2014	25 October 2014	6	0	3	3	0.00
Maribor	2 March 2016	7 March 2020	196	105	56	35	53.57
Slovan Bratislava	7 September 2020	9 May 2021	32	22	6	4	68.75
Pafos	30 June 2021	10 May 2022	33	11	14	8	33.33
Anorthosis Famagusta	22 June 2022	3 October 2022	5	2	1	2	40.00
Baniyas	8 June 2023	11 June 2024	29	7	7	15	24.14
Total			703	345	184	174	49.08

== Honours ==
=== Player ===
Partizan

- Yugoslav First League: 1986–87
- Yugoslav Cup: 1988–89, 1991–92

Sturm Graz

- Austrian Bundesliga: 1997–98, 1998–99
- Austrian Cup: 1995–96, 1996–97, 1998–99
- Austrian Supercup: 1996, 1998, 1999

=== Manager ===
Maribor

- Slovenian PrvaLiga: 2008–09, 2010–11, 2011–12, 2012–13, 2016–17, 2018–19
- Slovenian Cup: 2009–10, 2011–12, 2012–13, 2015–16
- Slovenian Supercup: 2009, 2012

Individual

- Slovenian PrvaLiga Manager of the Season: 2011–12
