= Mehrdad Minavand =

Iranian footballer (1975–2021)

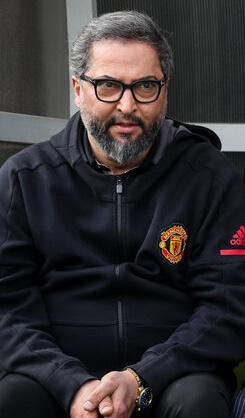
- Minavand in 2020

Personal information
- Date of birth: 30 November 1975
- Place of birth: Tehran, Iran
- Date of death: 27 January 2021 (aged 45)
- Place of death: Tehran, Iran
- Height: 1.78 m (5 ft 10 in)
- Position: Left midfielder

Youth career
- Atash Neshani

Senior career*
Years	Team	Apps	(Gls)
1994–1995	Pas		
1995–1998	Persepolis	89	(13)
1998–2001	Sturm Graz	67	(1)
2001–2002	Charleroi	2	(0)
2002	Al-Shabab		
2002–2004	Persepolis	19	(0)
2004–2005	Sepahan	19	(0)
2005–2006	Rah Ahan	0	(0)

International career
1996–2003	Iran	69	(4)

Managerial career
- 2009: Persepolis B
- 2014–2015: Khooneh Be Khooneh (assistant)
- 2016: Khooneh Be Khooneh (assistant)
- 2018: Sepidrood Rasht (assistant)
- * Club domestic league appearances and goals

Mehrdad Minavand (Persian: مهرداد میناوند; 30 November 1975 – 27 January 2021) was an Iranian professional footballer and coach. He played mostly as a left midfielder but was also deployed as a left winger or left-back.

== Club career ==
Minavand was born in Tehran. He played for a few clubs, including Keshavarz F.C., Persepolis FC, Sturm Graz (Austria), Sporting Charleroi (Belgium) and Al-Shabab (United Arab Emirates) as well as Sepahan. He last played for Rah Ahan FC, but left the team after the 2005–06 season. He played 21 matches in UEFA Champions League and he is all-time record holder among the Iranian footballers in this feature.

== International career ==
Minavand played for the Iran national team and was a participant at the 1998 FIFA World Cup.

== Death ==
On 21 January 2021, Minavand was hospitalised due to COVID-19. Six days later it was announced that he had died from the virus, at age 45.

== Career statistics ==
Appearances and goals by club, season and competition
Club	Season	League			Cup		Continental		Other		Total		Ref.
Club	Season	Division	Apps	Goals	Apps	Goals	Apps	Goals	Apps	Goals	Apps	Goals	Ref.
Persepolis	1995–96	Azadegan League	30	4							30	4	
Persepolis	1996–97	Azadegan League	31	5							31	5	
Persepolis	1997–98	Azadegan League	28	4							28	4	
Persepolis	Total		89	13	0	0	0	0	0	0	89	13	–
Sturm Graz	1998–99	Austrian Bundesliga	17	0	2	1	3	0	1	0	23	1	
Sturm Graz	1999–00	Austrian Bundesliga	23	0	0	0	5	0			28	0	
Sturm Graz	2000–01	Austrian Bundesliga	27	1	0	0	13	0			40	1	
Sturm Graz	Total		67	1	2	1	21	0	1	0	91	2	–
Charleroi	2001–02	Belgian First Division	2	0	0	0	—				2	0	
Persepolis	2002–03	Pro League	8	0							8	0	
Persepolis	2003–04	Pro League	11	0			—				11	0	
Persepolis	Total		19	0	0	0	0	0	0	0	19	0	–
Sepahan	2004–05	Pro League	19	0			—				19	0	
Career total			196	14	2	1	21	0	1	0	220	15	–

=== International ===
Appearances and goals by national team and year
National team	Year	Apps	Goals
Iran	1996	7	1
Iran	1997	16	2
Iran	1998	10	0
Iran	1999	3	0
Iran	2000	12	0
Iran	2001	16	1
Iran	2002	4	0
Iran	2003	1	0
Total		69	4

Scores and results list Iran's goal tally first, score column indicates score after each Minavand goal.

List of international goals scored by Mehrdad Minavand
No.	Date	Venue	Opponent	Score	Result	Competition
1	8 December 1996	Maktoum bin Rashid Al Maktoum Stadium, Dubai, United Arab Emirates	Thailand	2–0	3–1	1996 AFC Asian Cup
2	2 June 1997	Abbasiyyin Stadium, Damascus, Syria	Maldives	17–0	17–0	1998 FIFA World Cup qualification
3	4 June 1997	Abbasiyyin Stadium, Damascus, Syria	Kyrgyzstan	5–0	7–0	1998 FIFA World Cup qualification
4	31 October 2001	Al Nahyan Stadium, Abu Dhabi, United Arab Emirates	United Arab Emirates	3–0	3–0	2002 FIFA World Cup qualification

== Honours ==
Persepolis

- Iranian League: 1995–96, 1996–97

Sturm Graz

- Austrian Bundesliga: 1998–99
- Austrian Cup: 1998–99
- Austrian Supercup: 1998, 1999

Individual

- AFC Asian Cup Team of the Tournament: 1996
