= Thomas Weissenberger =

Austrian footballer

Personal information
- Date of birth: 28 May 1971 (age 55)
- Place of birth: Austria
- Height: 1.73 m (5 ft 8 in)
- Position: Striker

Youth career
- FC Hard

Senior career*
Years	Team	Apps	(Gls)
–1991	FC Hard		
1991–1992	SV Spittal		
1992–1993	1. FC Nürnberg	13	(0)
1993–1995	LASK Linz	59	(8)
1996–1997	FC Admira/Wacker		
1997–1999	Austria Lustenau	17	(1)
1999	First Vienna		
1999–2000	DSV Leoben		
2000–2001	SV Spittal		
2001–2002	SAK Klagenfurt		
2004	WSG Radenthein		
2004–2006	ASKÖ Fürnitz		
2006–2008	SV Rothenthurn		

International career
1994	Austria	1	(0)
- * Club domestic league appearances and goals

Thomas Weissenberger (born 28 May 1971) is an Austrian former footballer who played as a striker. He made one appearance for the Austria national team. He is the brother of Markus Weissenberger.
