= Tihomir Dragoslavić =

Austrian-Croatian footballer

Personal information
- Date of birth: 20 November 1967 (age 58)
- Position: Midfielder

Senior career*
Years	Team	Apps	(Gls)
–1993	DSV Leoben		
1993–1994	VfB Mödling	15	(2)
1994	FC Braunau		
1994–1997	DSV Leoben	41	(7)
1997–1999	SV Spittal/Drau	57	(6)
1999–2000	SV Rapid Lienz		
2000	SK Eintracht Wels		
2000–2004	FC Waidhofen/Ybbs	84	(12)
- * Club domestic league appearances and goals

Tihomir Dragoslavić (born 20 November 1967) is a former Austrian/Croatian footballer who played as a midfielder.
