= Gaudenzi =

Gaudenzi is an Italian surname. Notable people with the surname include:

- Andrea Gaudenzi (born 1973), Italian tennis player
- Gianluca Gaudenzi (born 1965), Italian footballer and manager
- Jochen Gaudenzi (born 1978), Austrian footballer and manager
- Pietro Gaudenzi (1880–1955), Italian painter
- Pietro Gaudenzi (bishop) (died 1664), Roman Catholic bishop
- Stefano Gaudenzi (born 1941), Italian tennis player
