= Helmut Rottensteiner =

Austrian footballer and manager

Personal information
- Date of birth: 16 March 1977 (age 49)
- Place of birth: Austria
- Height: 1.71 m (5 ft 7 1/2 in)
- Position: Midfielder

Youth career
- –1991: SV Wals-Grünau
- 1991–1996: SV Salzburg

Senior career*
Years	Team	Apps	(Gls)
1996–1997	Casino Salzburg	2	(0)
1997–2001	SC Bregenz	57	(6)
2001–2002	FC Braunau	12	(1)
2002–2004	FC Puch	49	(0)
2004–2005	SV Wals-Grünau		
2005	SV Seekirchen	13	(0)
2005–2008	TSV Neumarkt	34	(12)
2008–2010	SV Austria Salzburg	24	(3)
2010–2012	SV Austria Salzburg II		
2012–2013	SV Seekirchen	1	(0)

Managerial career
- 2010–2011: SV Austria Salzburg (assistant manager)
- 2012: SV Austria Salzburg II (assistant manager)
- 2012–2014: SV Seekirchen (assistant manager)
- 2012: SV Seekirchen (interim manager)
- 2014–2015: SV Seekirchen II
- * Club domestic league appearances and goals

Helmut Rottensteiner (born 16 March 1977) is an Austrian football manager and former footballer who played as a midfielder.
