= Robert Micheu =

Austrian footballer and manager

Personal information
- Date of birth: 8 July 1975 (age 51)
- Place of birth: Austria
- Height: 1.84 m (6 ft 0 in)
- Position: Midfielder

Team information
- Current team: Austria Klagenfurt (youth)

Youth career
- –1992: Austria Klagenfurt

Senior career*
Years	Team	Apps	(Gls)
1992–1993	Austria Klagenfurt		
1993–1995	LASK Linz	23	(0)
1995–1996	FC Linz		
1996–1999	FC Braunau	76	(16)
1999–2002	Admira Wacker	105	(8)
2002–2003	Wiener Sportklub	23	(1)
2003–2004	LASK Linz	31	(0)
2004–2012	SV Feldkirchen	127	(22)
2012–2015	SC Globasnitz	4	(1)
2015–2018	SV St. Margareten/Rosental		

International career
1996–1997	Austria U21	13	(1)

Managerial career
- 2009–2016: SV Feldkirchen
- 2017–2018: SC Globasnitz
- 2018–2020: Austria Klagenfurt
- 2020–: Austria Klagenfurt (youth)
- * Club domestic league appearances and goals

Robert Micheu (born 8 July 1975) is an Austrian football manager and a former player who played as a midfielder. He is an academy coach with Austria Klagenfurt.
