= Matthias Bleyer =

Austrian footballer

Personal information
- Date of birth: 1 August 1969 (age 57)
- Place of birth: Oberpullendorf, Austria
- Height: 1.78 m (5 ft 10 in)
- Position: Forward

Senior career*
Years	Team	Apps	(Gls)
–1990	SC Eisenstadt		
1990–1991	Wiener Sport-Club	20	(5)
1991	Favoritner AC		
1991–1992	SK Rapid Wien	13	(0)
1993–1994	First Vienna FC		
1994–1996	FC Braunau	22	(11)
1996–1997	FC Linz	8	(0)
1997–1998	SKN St. Pölten		
1998–2000	SC Bregenz	53	(19)
2000–2002	BSV Bad Bleiberg	61	(40)
2002–2003	SC/ESV Parndorf		
2003–2004	SC Schwanenstadt		
2004	Wiener Sport-Club	14	(1)
2004–2005	ASK Marienthal		
2005–2009	SV Draßmarkt		
2014	SC Kroatisch Geresdorf		

International career
1990–1991	Austria U21	9	(5)
- * Club domestic league appearances and goals

Matthias Bleyer (born 1 August 1969) is a former footballer who played as a forward.
