= Markus Weissenberger =

Austrian footballer (born 1975)

Personal information
- Full name: Markus Weissenberger
- Date of birth: 8 March 1975 (age 51)
- Place of birth: Lauterach, Austria
- Height: 1.68 m (5 ft 6 in)
- Position: Midfielder

Youth career
- 1980–1988: FC Hard
- 1988–1991: FC Dornbirn
- 1991–1993: SV Spittal

Senior career*
| Years | Team | Apps | (Gls) |
| 1993–1994 | SV Spittal | 59 | (24) |
| 1995–1999 | LASK | 134 | (26) |
| 1999–2001 | Arminia Bielefeld | 54 | (12) |
| 2001–2004 | 1860 Munich | 74 | (7) |
| 2004–2008 | Eintracht Frankfurt | 69 | (4) |
| 2008–2010 | LASK | 10 | (0) |
| Total | | 400 | (73) |

International career
| 1999–2008 | Austria | 29 | (1) |
- * Club domestic league appearances and goals

Markus Weissenberger (born 8 March 1975) is an Austrian former professional footballer who played as a midfielder.

He is a younger brother of former Austria international player Thomas Weissenberger.

== Club career ==
Weissenberger played for Eintracht Frankfurt, TSV 1860 Munich, Arminia Bielefeld, LASK.

In the Eintracht squad he was, in the attacking midfield, often only a backup for Alexander Meier and predominantly gets few short time appearances.

He returned to LASK in summer 2008 on a free transfer.

== International career ==
Weissenberger made his debut for the Austria national team in an August 1999 friendly match against Sweden, coming on as a substitute for Mario Haas. He missed out on Euro 2008, after coming back late from a knee injury.

He earned 29 caps, scoring one goal, until August 2008.

== International goal ==
Scores and results list Austria's goal tally first.

| No | Date | Venue | Opponent | Score | Result | Competition |
|---|---|---|---|---|---|---|
| 1. | 27 March 2002 | Merkur-Arena, Graz, Austria | Slovakia | 2–0 | 2–0 | Friendly match |

== Career statistics ==
=== International ===
Appearances and goals by national team and year
| National team | Year | Apps | Goals |
|---|---|---|---|
| Austria | 1999 | 3 | 0 |
| Austria | 2000 | 3 | 0 |
| Austria | 2001 | 6 | 0 |
| Austria | 2002 | 6 | 1 |
| Austria | 2003 | 3 | 0 |
| Austria | 2004 | 0 | 0 |
| Austria | 2005 | 1 | 0 |
| Austria | 2006 | 2 | 0 |
| Austria | 2007 | 4 | 0 |
| Austria | 2008 | 1 | 0 |
| Total | | 29 | 1 |

== Honours ==
Eintracht Frankfurt

- DFB-Pokal runner-up: 2005–06
