= Zoran Vujic =

Austrian footballer

Personal information
- Date of birth: 8 March 1972 (age 54)
- Place of birth: Bogatić, SFR Yugoslavia
- Height: 1.81 m (5 ft 11 in)
- Position: Forward

Senior career*
Years	Team	Apps	(Gls)
1990–1992	SC Rheindorf Altach		
1992–1993	TSV Schwarzach		
1993–1994	SC Rheindorf Altach		
1994–1995	Austria Lustenau		
1995–1996	FC Dornbirn		
1996–1998	SC Rheindorf Altach		
1998–2003	Austria Lustenau		
1999–2000	→ SV Braunau (loan)		
2003–2004	SC Rheindorf Altach		
2004–2005	Viktoria Bregenz		
- * Club domestic league appearances and goals

Zoran Vujic (born 8 March 1972) is a Yugoslavian-born Austrian football striker. He played in the Austrian Football Bundesliga for Austria Lustenau.
