= Jürgen Pichorner =

Austrian footballer

Personal information
- Full name: Jürgen Gerhard Pichorner
- Date of birth: 31 August 1977 (age 49)
- Place of birth: Villach, Austria
- Height: 1.75 m (5 ft 9 in)
- Position: Midfielder

Team information
- Current team: SV Rothenthurn

Senior career*
Years	Team	Apps	(Gls)
2000–2001	LASK Linz	53	(2)
2001–2006	Red Bull Salzburg	108	(5)
2006–2008	SV Ried	53	(7)
2008–2009	Austria Kärnten	10	(0)
2009–2010	SCR Altach	21	(1)
2010–2014	SV Spittal	102	(16)
2014–	SV Rothenthurn		
- * Club domestic league appearances and goals as of 14 June 2009

Jürgen Gerhard Pichorner (born 31 August 1977) is an Austrian football midfielder who currently plays for SCR Altach.
