= Ján Kožiak =

Slovak footballer

Personal information
- Date of birth: 13 August 1978 (age 48)
- Place of birth: Košice, Czechoslovakia
- Height: 1.83 m (6 ft 0 in)
- Position: Striker

Senior career*
Years	Team	Apps	(Gls)
1999–2000	Dukla Trencin		
2000	FK Koba Senec		
2000–2001	FC Braunau		
2001–2003	SV Horn		
2003	Kremser SC	15	(18)
2003–2004	SV Mattersburg	18	(1)
2004–2005	Austria Lustenau	27	(7)
2005–2006	Dukla Banska Bystrica		
2006–2007	Dynamo Dresden	11	(1)
2007–2008	Zalgiris Vilnius		
2008	SV Bad Aussee	4	(0)
2008–2009	FC Zlate Moravce	18	(1)
2009–2012	FSV Zwickau	20	(2)
- * Club domestic league appearances and goals

Ján Kožiak (born 13 August 1978) is a Slovak footballer.
