= 1996–97 Austrian Cup =

Tournament details
- Country: Austria

Final positions
- Champions: Sturm Graz
- Runners-up: First Vienna FC

The 1996–97 Austrian Cup (German: ÖFB-Cup) was the 63rd season of Austria's nationwide football cup competition. The final was held at the Ernst-Happel-Stadion, Vienna on 27 May 1997.

The competition was won by Sturm Graz after beating First Vienna FC 2–1.

== First round ==
Team 1	Score	Team 2
11 August 1996
Prater SV	7–0	Fortuna 05 Wien
13 August 1996
FC Veitsch	0–7	VSE St. Pölten
Deutschlandsberger SC	0–7	DSV Leoben
Wiener Sport-Club	2–1	VfB Mödling
14 August 1996
ASK Kottingbrunn	2–1 (a.e.t.)	ASK Stoob
ASK Ybbs	0–3	ASK Baumgarten
ATSV Sattledt	1–3	SC Breitenfeld
Amateure Steyr	1–1 (a.e.t.) (2–4 p)	FC St. Veit
FC ÖMV Stadlau	0–3	Favoritner AC
SC Helfort/Phönix	0–1	1. SC Wiener Neustadt
ISS Admira Landhaus	0–1	FC Waidhofen/Ybbs
SC Bruck/Mur	2–3 (a.e.t.) (2–3 p)	TSV Hartberg
SC Eisenstadt	7–1	SC/ESV Parndorf 1919
SC Großklein	0–2	SK Vorwärts Steyr
SC Zwettl	0–4	1. Simmeringer SC
SK Schärding	1–0 (a.e.t.)	SV Anger
SK St. Magdalena	1–3	SV Flavia Solva
SV Feldbach	2–1 (a.e.t.)	ATSV Lenzing
SV Grieskirchen	1–5	ASK Voitsberg
SV Leibnitz	0–2	Donau Linz
SV Mattersburg	2–2 (a.e.t.) (2–4 p)	SV Gerasdorf
SVG Bleiburg	5–2	SV Bad Schallerbach
UFC St. Peter/Au	3–1	Wienerberg/Inzersdorf
USK Rottenmann	2–0	FC St. Michael/Lavanttal
Union St. Florian	2–1	FC Gratkorn
15 August 1996
FC Tulln	4–0	Post SV Wien
SV Langenrohr	2–1 (a.e.t.)	SC Viktoria Wien
SC Neudörfl	1–1 (a.e.t.) (5–6 p)	SC Amaliendorf
Union Esternberg	0–3	Villacher SV
20 August 1996
FC Puch	2–0	FC Kufstein
VfB Hohenems	0–1	ESV Saalfelden
Wolfsberger AC	0–2	SV Spittal/Drau
ÖTSU Henndorf	3–1	Salzburger AK 1914
21 August 1996
FC Frastanz	2–3	SC Rheindorf Altach
FC Lustenau 07	4–1	SV Axams
FC Tirol Innsbruck Amateure	0–7	SV Braunau
FC Vils	0–5	Viktoria 62 Bregenz
SC Kundl	1–2 (a.e.t.)	Schwarz-Weiß Bregenz
SPG Rum	0–5	SC Austria Lustenau
Austria Salzburg Amateure	2–4	SV Wörgl
SV Wals-Grünau	0–4	WSG Wattens

== Second round ==
Team 1	Score	Team 2
3 September 1996
FC Waidhofen/Ybbs	1–2 (a.e.t.)	ASK Kottingbrunn
4 September 1996
SC Rheindorf Altach	1–2	FC Lustenau 07
6 September 1996
SC Eisenstadt	3–1	SV Stockerau
Wiener Sport-Club	5–0	SC Amaliendorf
7 September 1996
1. SC Wiener Neustadt	4–0	SV Langenrohr
1. Simmeringer SC	1–3	Favoritner AC
ASK Baumgarten	1–0	VSE St. Pölten
Donau Linz	4–1	SV Flavia Solva
Prater SV	1–4	SV Gerasdorf
SC Breitenfeld	1–3	TSV Hartberg
FC Tulln	1–3	First Vienna FC
SK Schärding	2–2 (a.e.t.) (4–3 p)	SV Braunau
SV Feldbach	0–2	SK Vorwärts Steyr
SV Wörgl	1–2	SC Austria Lustenau
SVG Bleiburg	2–1	ASK Voitsberg
USK Rottenmann	1–3 (a.e.t.)	UFC St. Peter/Au
Villacher SV	2–1 (a.e.t.)	SC Marchtrenk
8 September 1996
ESV Saalfelden	3–1	ÖTSU Henndorf
FC Puch	0–3	WSG Wattens
FC St. Veit	1–2	SV Spittal/Drau
Union St. Florian	2–2 (a.e.t.) (1–4 p)	DSV Leoben
Viktoria 62 Bregenz	0–4	Schwarz-Weiß Bregenz

== Third round ==
Team 1	Score	Team 2
27 September 1996
ASK Baumgarten	1–5	Grazer AK
Donau Linz	0–1	SV Ried
TSV Hartberg	0–3	SCN Admira/Wacker
28 September 1996
ASK Kottingbrunn	2–1	SK Rapid Wien
ESV Saalfelden	0–5	SV Austria Salzburg
SC Eisenstadt	1–4	SV Gerasdorf
SK Schärding	0–11	FC Tirol Innsbruck
SVG Bleiburg	2–2 (a.e.t.) (1–4 p)	SV Spittal/Drau
Schwarz-Weiß Bregenz	0–4	SC Austria Lustenau
UFC St. Peter/Au	1–3	FC Linz
First Vienna FC	3–1	FK Austria Wien
SK Vorwärts Steyr	0–6	LASK
29 September 1996
1. SC Wiener Neustadt	0–2	DSV Leoben
FC Lustenau 07	0–3	WSG Wattens
Villacher SV	0–2	SK Sturm Graz
Wiener Sport-Club	2–1	Favoritner AC

== Fourth round ==
Team 1	Score	Team 2
1 November 1996
Wiener Sport-Club	3–0	SV Ried
2 November 1996
ASK Kottingbrunn	1–5	LASK
SC Austria Lustenau	2–2 (a.e.t.) (4–3 p)	SCN Admira/Wacker
FC Linz	0–2	FC Tirol Innsbruck
SV Gerasdorf	3–3 (a.e.t.) (4–5 p)	Grazer AK
SV Spittal/Drau	0–2	SK Sturm Graz
First Vienna FC	3–0	DSV Leoben
WSG Wattens	1–3	SV Austria Salzburg

== Quarter-finals ==
Team 1	Score	Team 2
8 April 1997
SC Austria Lustenau	2–3	SK Sturm Graz
FC Tirol Innsbruck	0–1	LASK
Grazer AK	0–1	First Vienna FC
Wiener Sport-Club	0–1	SV Austria Salzburg

== Semi-finals ==
Team 1	Score	Team 2
6 May 1997
LASK	0–1	SK Sturm Graz
First Vienna FC	2–2 (a.e.t.) (8–7 p)	SV Austria Salzburg

== Final ==
27 May 1997
20:30

First Vienna FC	1–2	SK Sturm Graz
Posch 88' (o.g.)	Report	Vastić 5' (pen.); Dowe 74'

Ernst-Happel-Stadion, Vienna
Attendance: 14,000
Referee: Dietmar Drabek
