= Arnold Schwellensattl =

Italian footballer and manager (born 1975)

Personal information
- Date of birth: 13 January 1975 (age 51)
- Place of birth: Merano, Italy
- Height: 1.85 m (6 ft 1 in)
- Position: Forward

Youth career
- –1995: Atalanta

Senior career*
Years	Team	Apps	(Gls)
1995–1996	WSG Wattens	18	(4)
1996–1997	VfB Mödling	27	(10)
1997–1999	Admira Wacker	46	(10)
1999–2001	TSV 1860 München II	26	(4)
2001	Chongqing Lifan		
2001–2002	DSV Leoben	12	(1)
2002–2003	IK Start	5	(0)
2003–2004	LASK Linz	29	(5)
2004–2006	SC Schwanenstadt	1	(0)
2006	SK Vorwärts Steyr		
- * Club domestic league appearances and goals

Arnold Schwellensattl (born 13 January 1975) is an Italian football manager and former footballer who played as a forward.
