= Andreas Golombek =

German footballer and manager

Personal information
- Date of birth: 9 August 1968 (age 58)
- Place of birth: Amshausen, West Germany
- Height: 1.91 m (6 ft 3 in)
- Position: Midfielder

Youth career
- TSV Amshausen
- Arminia Bielefeld

Senior career*
Years	Team	Apps	(Gls)
1987–1990	Arminia Bielefeld	75	(14)
1990–1991	SC Freiburg	29	(3)
1991–1993	VfL Osnabrück	62	(7)
1993–1994	SC Verl	26	(8)
1994–1996	SG Wattenscheid 09	61	(7)
1996–1997	Fortuna Düsseldorf	3	(0)
1997	KFC Uerdingen 05	14	(1)
1997–1998	LR Ahlen	8	(2)
1998–1999	Grazer AK	13	(1)
1999–2002	1.FC Magdeburg	44	(7)
2002–2003	Borussia Neunkirchen	35	(4)
2003–2005	VfV 06 Hildesheim	21	(5)
Total		391	(59)

Managerial career
- 2003: Borussia Neunkirchen (player-coach)
- 2005–2012: VfV 06 Hildesheim
- 2013–2017: SC Verl
- 2017–2018: Sportfreunde Lotte
- 2020–2021: BSV Schwarz-Weiß Rehden
- 2022–2023: Rot-Weiss Ahlen
- * Club domestic league appearances and goals

Andreas Golombek (born 9 August 1968) is a German former professional footballer and manager who last managed Rot-Weiss Ahlen. He previously managed Sportfreunde Lotte.
