= Marcus Skokan =

Austrian footballer

Personal information
- Date of birth: 25 June 1977 (age 49)
- Height: 1.72 m (5 ft 7 1/2 in)
- Position: Defender

Senior career*
| Years | Team | Apps | (Gls) |
| –1995 | SK Rapid Wien II | | |
| 1995–1998 | SV Gerasdorf/Stammersdorf | 47 | (4) |
| 1998–1999 | SKN St. Pölten | 15 | (3) |
| 1999–2003 | Floridsdorfer AC | 95 | (10) |
| 2003–2008 | SC Ostbahn XI | 112 | (12) |
| 2008–2009 | SV Donau Langenlebarn | 7 | (1) |
- * Club domestic league appearances and goals

Marcus Skokan (born 25 June 1977) is a former Austrian footballer who played as a defender.
