= Jürgen Panis =

Austrian footballer

Personal information
- Full name: Jürgen Panis
- Date of birth: 21 April 1975 (age 51)
- Place of birth: Wiener Neustadt, Austria
- Height: 1.70 m (5 ft 7 in)
- Position: Midfielder

Youth career
- 1981–1990: Hochwolkersdorf Bromberg
- 1990–1993: Admira Wacker

Senior career*
| Years | Team | Apps | (Gls) |
| 1993–1997 | Admira Wacker | 102 | (19) |
| 1997–2000 | LASK | 79 | (4) |
| 2000–2002 | Tirol Innsbruck | 47 | (4) |
| 2002–2004 | Austria Wien | 19 | (0) |
| 2004–2005 | SC Untersiebenbrunn | 33 | (2) |
| 2005–2006 | Admira Wacker | 32 | (0) |
| 2006–2010 | LASK | 96 | (5) |
| 2010–2011 | FC Pasching | 11 | (0) |
| 2011 | 1. SC Sollenau | 4 | (0) |
| 2011–2013 | ASKÖ Pregarten | 32 | (8) |
| 2013–2014 | SV Eibenstein | 33 | (12) |
| 2014 | ASKÖ Linz Zöhrdorf | 10 | (3) |
| 2016–2017 | St. Martin/Traun | | |

International career
| 1993–1997 | Austria U-21 | 13 | (0) |
| 2002 | Austria | 5 | (0) |

Managerial career
- 2012–2014: LASK (youth)
- 2012–2019: Union Pettenbach (youth)
- 2015–2017: ATSV St. Martin/Traun
- 2017–2019: ASKÖ Luftenberg
- 2019–2020: Blau-Weiß Linz II (assistant)
- * Club domestic league appearances and goals

Jürgen Panis (born 21 April 1975, in Wiener Neustadt) is an Austrian retired footballer. He won his first silverware with FC Tirol Innsbruck, then with Vienna giants Austria Wien where he was brought in a package deal with Radoslaw Gilewicz

== Career ==
=== Club career ===
Panis began his career with the younger generation of at SC Hochwolkersdorf-Bromberg, where he was noticed by the scouts of Admira Wacker and was brought to their youth academy.

In 1993 Panis received his first professional contract and played from 1993 to 1997 with Admira Wacker. In 1997 he went to LASK in Linz. After the relegation of the black and whites in 2000, the midfielder moved to FC Tirol Innsbruck, where he became Austrian champion three times. After the club went bankrupt, Panis was moved to FK Austria Wien in 2002. At Austria, where Panis celebrated his fourth championship title and a cup title, he played until 2004.

A serious injury ended his spell with Austria and he restarted his career at lower league side Untersiebenbrunn. He returned to Austria's top level with Admira, but when they relegated he signed up for LASK Linz again.

=== International career ===
He made his debut for Austria in a March 2002 friendly match against Slovakia. He earned 5 caps, no goals scored. His last international was a September 2002 European Championship qualification match against Moldova.

=== Coaching and later career ===
After retiring from professional football, Panis played for Austrian lower clubs 1. SC Sollenau (2011) and ASKÖ Pregarten (2011-2013. He also began his coaching career in 2012 as a youth coach at both his former club LASK and at Union Pettenbach.

Panis left his position at LASK in 2014 but continued working as a youth coach at Union Pettenbach until 2019. However, he had several jobs beside that:

- In 2013-14 he played for SV Eibenstein and in 2014 for ASKÖ Linz Zöhrdorf.
- In January 2015, he was appointed head coach of ATSV St. Martin/Traun, where he also was active as a player.
- In the summer 2017, he was appointed head coach of ASKÖ Luftenberg which he was until April 19.

After leaving his position at Union Pettenbach in 2019, he became the assistant coach of FC Blau-Weiß Linz' reserve team. Panis left the club on 20 October 2020, when the head coach was fired.

== Honours ==
- Austrian Football Bundesliga (4):
  - 2000, 2001, 2002, 2003
- Austrian Cup (1):
  - 2003
