= Herbert Linimair =

Austrian footballer

Personal information
- Date of birth: 23 November 1973 (age 52)
- Place of birth: Wels, Austria
- Height: 1.83 m (6 ft 0 in)
- Position: Midfielder

Team information
- Current team: Union Regau
- Number: 13

Youth career
- 1980–1990: SC Marchtrenk

Senior career*
Years	Team	Apps	(Gls)
1990–1994	SK Vorwärts Steyr	19	(0)
1994–1997	FC Linz	79	(5)
1997–2002	Admira Wacker	129	(13)
2002–2004	BSV Bad Bleiberg	72	(6)
2004–2008	SC Marchtrenk		
2008–2010	SV Grieskirchen	34	(15)
2010	Union Gunskirchen		
2010–2011	Union Thalheim		
2011–	Union Regau		
- * Club domestic league appearances and goals

Herbert Linimair (born 23 November 1973) is an Austrian footballer who plays as a midfielder for Union Regau.
