= Untersiebenbrunn =

- Municipality
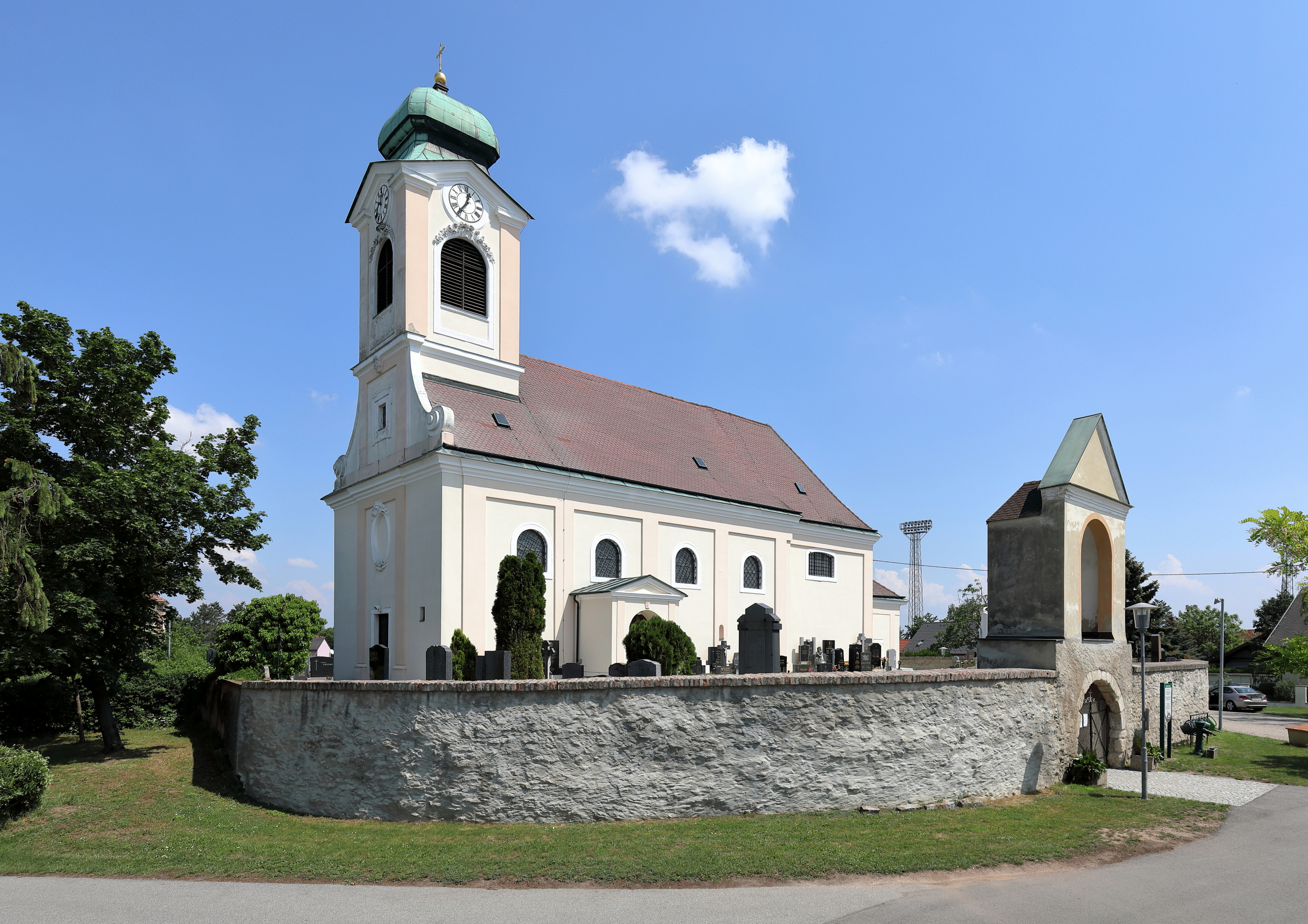
- Saint Vitus Church

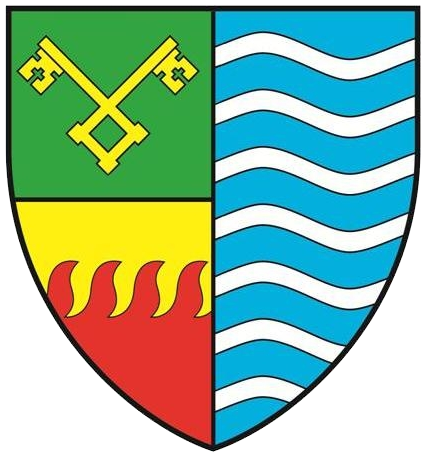
- Coat of arms

- Location within Austria
- Coordinates: 48°15′N 16°43′E
- Country: Austria
- State: Lower Austria
- District: Gänserndorf

Government
  - Mayor: Reinhold Steinmetz (SPÖ)

Area
  - Total: 30.49 km^{2} (11.77 sq mi)
- Elevation: 158 m (518 ft)

Population (2018-01-01)
  - Total: 1,736
  - Density: 56.94/km^{2} (147.5/sq mi)
- Time zone: UTC+1 (CET)
  - Summer (DST): UTC+2 (CEST)
- Postal code: 2284
- Area code: 02286

Untersiebenbrunn is a town in the district of Gänserndorf in the Austrian state of Lower Austria.

The town's Catholic Church is part of the Archdiocese of Vienna, and the Marchfeld group of parishes, under the patronage of Melk Abbey.

The Hubertus Kapelle (chapel) on Siebenbrunnerstrasse commemorates the Huburtus deer hunt.

== Population ==
Historical population
Year	Pop.	±%
1869	424	—
1971	1,299	+206.4%
1981	1,271	−2.2%
1991	1,300	+2.3%
2001	1,400	+7.7%
2011	1,467	+4.8%
