= Klaus Rohseano =

Austrian footballer

Personal information
- Date of birth: September 8, 1969 (age 57)
- Place of birth: Feldkirchen in Kärnten
- Height: 1.79 m (5 ft 10 in)
- Position: Defender

Team information
- Current team: SV Feldkirchen (manager)

Youth career
- SV Feldkirchen

Senior career*
Years	Team	Apps	(Gls)
–1995	SV Feldkirchen		
1995–1999	LASK Linz	162	(3)
2000–2001	SC Bregenz	11	(0)
2001–2003	FC Kärnten	58	(2)
2003–2004	BSV Bad Bleiberg	34	(0)
2004–2008	SV Feldkirchen	61	(0)

International career
1999	Austria	1	(0)

Managerial career
- 2008–2009: SV Feldkirchen
- 2012–2014: SV Moosburg
- * Club domestic league appearances and goals

Klaus Rohseano (born September 8, 1969) is a retired Austria international football player and a coach who managed SV Feldkirchen.
