= Sancho Jani =

Austrian footballer

Personal information
- Date of birth: 12 August 1974 (age 52)
- Place of birth: Austria
- Height: 1.84 m (6 ft 1/2 in)
- Position: Forward

Youth career
- 1988–1990: AKA Burgenland

Senior career*
Years	Team	Apps	(Gls)
1990–1995	SV Neuberg		
1995–1996	TSV Hartberg		
1996–1998	SV Neuberg	4	(2)
1998–2000	SC Bregenz	58	(8)
2000–2002	FC Untersiebenbrunn	28	(8)
2002	First Vienna FC	14	(0)
2002–2005	DSV Leoben	83	(17)
2005	SC Weiz		
2005–2006	Wiener Sport-Club	26	(3)
2006–2008	SV Neuberg	1	(0)
2008–2009	SV Oberwart	2	(1)
2009–2010	UFC Markt Allhau		
2010–2012	USC Pilgersdorf		
- * Club domestic league appearances and goals

Sancho Jani (born 12 August 1974) is an Austrian former footballer who played as a forward.
