= Alexander Guem =

Austrian footballer (born 1977)

Personal information
- Date of birth: 6 March 1977 (age 49)
- Place of birth: Feldkirch, Austria
- Height: 1.80 m (5 ft 11 in)
- Position: Defender

Senior career*
Years	Team	Apps	(Gls)
1997–2001	SC Rheindorf Altach	5	(0)
2001–2003	SC Austria Lustenau	48	(0)
2003–2012	SC Rheindorf Altach	233	(8)

International career^{‡}
- Austria
- * Club domestic league appearances and goals as of 16:06, 29 September 2012 (UTC) ‡ National team caps and goals as of 16:06, 14 December 2008 (UTC)

Alexander Guem (born 6 March 1977) is a former Austrian football player. He spent most of his career playing for SC Rheindorf Altach.
