= Cheikh Sidy Ba =

Senegalese footballer

Personal information
- Date of birth: 31 March 1968 (age 58)
- Place of birth: Dakar, Senegal
- Height: 1.87 m (6 ft 1 1/2 in)
- Position: Defender

Senior career*
Years	Team	Apps	(Gls)
1996	ASC Diaraf		
1997–2000	LASK Linz	123	(2)
2001–2006	ASC Diaraf		

International career
2000	Senegal	9	(1)
- * Club domestic league appearances and goals

Cheikh Sidy Ba (born 31 March 1968) is a Senegalese former footballer who played as a defender.
