= Emir Music =

Austrian/Croatian footballer and manager

Personal information
- Date of birth: 1 September 1964 (age 62)
- Place of birth: Bosanska Krupa, Bosnia
- Height: 1.83 m (6 ft 0 in)
- Position: Forward

Senior career*
Years	Team	Apps	(Gls)
1990–1991	NK Osijek		
1991–1993	CD Castellón		
1993–1994	SK Vorwärts Steyr	26	(7)
1994–1996	Varteks	22	(5)
1996–2000	SV Wörgl	51	(16)

Managerial career
- 2005–2006: FC Kufstein
- 2007–2008: SK St. Johann
- 2008–2009: FC Kramsach
- 2010–2012: SC Kundl
- 2012–2013: SK St. Johann
- * Club domestic league appearances and goals

Emir Music (born 1 September 1964) is an Austrian/Croatian football manager and former footballer who played as a striker.

== Club career ==
Born in Bosanska Krupa, Bosnia, back then still within Yugoslavia, he started playing with local club NK Bratstvo Bosanska Krupa. Soon after showing his scoring skills at his local club, he has been transferred to the higher league club NK Prijedor before making his first appearance in the Yugoslav First League in 1990 when he was playing for NK Osijek. He then moved to CD Castellón in Spain where he played for 2 seasons. In summer of 1993, he moved to the Austrian first league club Vorwärts Steyr where he played a strong first half of the season, leading the top scorer list prior to getting injured. After just one season, he was transferred to Croatian club Varteks, where he stayed two seasons. In 1996, he made a move back to Austria to SV Wörgl where he became one of the pillars in the offense leading the club as the top scorer into the second league. In 2000, still playing for SV Wörgl in the second league, he retired from professional football.
