= Dietmar Kantauer =

Austrian footballer

Personal information
- Date of birth: 19 May 1971 (age 55)
- Place of birth: Austria
- Height: 1.81 m (5 ft 11 1/2 in)
- Position: Forward

Youth career
- –1990: SK Rapid Wien

Senior career*
Years	Team	Apps	(Gls)
1990–1991	SV Neuberg		
1991–1993	USV Rudersdorf		
1993–1995	FC Gratkorn		
1995–1996	SV Oberwart	21	(6)
1996–2003	SV Mattersburg	162	(49)
2003–2004	SV Neuberg	23	(9)
2004–2008	USV Burgauberg/Neudauberg		
2008–2009	SC Kemeten		
2009	SV Mühlgraben		
2009–2012	SV Neuberg		
2012–	ASK Oberdorf		
- * Club domestic league appearances and goals

Dietmar Kantauer (born 19 May 1971) is an Austrian former footballer who played as a forward.
