= Michael Mehlem =

Austrian footballer

Personal information
- Date of birth: 1 May 1977 (age 49)
- Place of birth: Austria
- Height: 1.83 m (6 ft 0 in)
- Position: Midfielder

Youth career
- 1983–1994: SV Gallneukirchen

Senior career*
Years	Team	Apps	(Gls)
1994–1996	SV Gallneukirchen		
1996–1997	SK St. Magdalena		
1997–2001	LASK Linz	73	(0)
2001–2004	SC Bregenz	45	(0)
2004–2005	SC Schwanenstadt 08		
2005–2006	LASK Linz	23	(0)
2006–2007	SV Ried	2	(0)
2007–2012	SK Vorwärts Steyr	56	(4)
- * Club domestic league appearances and goals

Michael Mehlem (born 1 May 1977) is an Austrian former footballer who played as a midfielder.
