= Rivallino Sleur =

Dutch footballer (born 1976)

Personal information
- Date of birth: 17 March 1976 (age 50)
- Place of birth: Netherlands
- Height: 1.83 m (6 ft 0 in)
- Position: Defender

Senior career*
Years	Team	Apps	(Gls)
–1998	AZ		
1998–2000	Austria Klagenfurt	53	(4)
2000–2003	AFC		
2003–2004	JOS Watergraafsmeer		
2004–2005	Ajax Amateurs		
2005–2006	Lisse		
2006–2008	Ter Leede		
2008–2009	Quick Boys		
2009–2011	Alphense Boys		
2011–2013	Zeeburgia		
- * Club domestic league appearances and goals

Rivallino Sleur (born 17 March 1976) is a Dutch former professional footballer who played as a defender.

During his professional career, he played for AZ Alkmaar and for Austria Klagenfurt before spending the rest of his career at semi-professional level at lower tier clubs in the Netherlands.
