= Andreas Rühmkorf =

Austrian footballer

Personal information
- Date of birth: 4 April 1966 (age 60)
- Place of birth: Austria
- Position: Forward

Senior career*
Years	Team	Apps	(Gls)
–1987	Admira/Wacker	12	(0)
1987–1988	Kremser SC		
1988–1989	SV Stockerau		
1989–1992	SR Donaufeld		
1992–1994	VfB Mödling	36	(6)
1994–1998	SV Gerasdorf/Stammersdorf	68	(31)
1998–1999	SKN St. Pölten	31	(5)
1999–2000	Floridsdorfer AC	26	(5)
2000–2001	SC Retz	4	(1)
2001	DSV Fortuna 05 Wien	14	(7)
2001–2005	SC Ostbahn XI	23	(11)
- * Club domestic league appearances and goals

Andreas Rühmkorf (born 4 April 1966) is a former Austrian footballer who played as a forward.
