= Rudolf Gussnig =

Austrian footballer

Personal information
- Date of birth: 19 June 1969 (age 57)
- Place of birth: Obervellach, Austria
- Height: 1.86 m (6 ft 1 in)
- Position: Forward

Senior career*
Years	Team	Apps	(Gls)
–1986	FC Mölltal Obervellach		
1986–1990	FC Mölltal Obervellach		
1990–1992	FC Tirol	23	(6)
1992–1993	SKN St. Pölten	25	(4)
1993–1994	FC Wacker	17	(0)
1994–1995	SC Rheindorf Altach	14	(0)
1995	FC St. Gallen	8	(1)
1995–1996	LASK Linz	14	(0)
1996	SV Leibnitz Flavia Solva	1	(1)
1996–2005	SC Rheindorf Altach	169	(5)

Managerial career
- 2007–2008: SC Rheindorf Altach II
- * Club domestic league appearances and goals

Rudolf Gussnig (born 19 June 1969) is an Austrian football manager and former footballer who played as a forward.
