= Herbert Grassler =

Austrian footballer and manager

Personal information
- Date of birth: 26 May 1976 (age 50)
- Place of birth: Wolfsberg, Austria
- Height: 1.81 m (5 ft 11 1/2 in)
- Position: Midfielder

Youth career
- 1989–1990: Wolfsberger AC

Senior career*
Years	Team	Apps	(Gls)
1991–1992	ATSV Wolfsberg		
1992–1997	SK Sturm Graz	114	(5)
1997–1998	Wüstenrot Salzburg	18	(2)
1998–2002	LASK Linz	111	(7)
2002–2004	SV Ried	37	(0)
2004–2005	Union St. Florian		
2005–2007	SK St. Andrä	25	(0)
2007–2009	WAC St. Andrä	1	(0)
2010	SC St. Stefan/L.	3	(0)

International career
1993–1995	Austria U21	20	(0)

Managerial career
- 2007–2009: Wolfsberger AC Jugend
- 2009–2010: AKA Kärnten U17
- 2010–2013: Wolfsberger AC Jugend
- 2014–2015: Wolfsberger AC Jugend
- * Club domestic league appearances and goals

Herbert Grassler (born 26 May 1976) is an Austrian football manager and former footballer who played as a midfielder.
