= Peter Mráz (footballer, born 1975) =

Slovak footballer

Personal information
- Date of birth: 26 August 1975 (age 51)
- Place of birth: Bratislava, Slovakia, Czechoslovakia
- Height: 1.80 m (5 ft 11 in)
- Position: Midfielder

Senior career*
Years	Team	Apps	(Gls)
–1996	Inter Bratislava		
1996–2000	Admira/Wacker	95	(7)
2000–2001	Viktoria Plzeň		
2001–2002	MFK Dubnica		
2002	SV Schwechat	11	(0)
2002–2005	Inter Bratislava		
2005–2006	OMV Stadlau	15	(6)
2006–2007	SC Frauenkirchen		
2007–2008	FC Stadlau	23	(10)
2008–2009	SG Neudorf/Parndorf		
- * Club domestic league appearances and goals

Peter Mráz (born 26 August 1975) is a former Slovak footballer who played as a midfielder.

== Honours ==
- Austrian Football First League: 1999-2000
