= Anton Köszegi =

Austrian footballer

Personal information
- Date of birth: 31 October 1970 (age 55)
- Place of birth: Eisenstadt, Austria
- Height: 1.89 m (6 ft 2 1/2 in)
- Position: Forward

Senior career*
Years	Team	Apps	(Gls)
–1992	SV Mattersburg		
1992–1994	SV Oberwart	1	(0)
1994–2005	SV Mattersburg	237	(65)
- * Club domestic league appearances and goals

Anton Köszegi (born 31 October 1970) is an Austrian former footballer who played as a forward.
