= Christian Köll =

Austrian footballer and manager

Personal information
- Date of birth: 15 October 1975 (age 51)
- Position: Forward

Youth career
- 1982–1990: SC Imst
- 1990–1994: FC Tirol

Senior career*
Years	Team	Apps	(Gls)
1994–1995	FC Tirol	2	(0)
1995–1996	WSG Wattens	17	(1)
1996	SC Kundl		
1996–1997	WSG Wattens	20	(0)
1998–1999	SVG Reichenau		
1999–2002	FC Lustenau	68	(2)
2002–2003	FC Blau-Weiß Feldkirch	33	(0)
2003–2008	FC Bizau		

Managerial career
- 2004–2008: FC Bizau (player-coach)
- 2008–2012: AKA Vorarlberg (youth coach)
- 2012–2013: FC Andelsbuch
- 2013–2015: FC Lustenau
- 2015: FC Lustenau (academy manager)
- 2015: FC Bizau (caretaker)
- 2016–2017: FC Koblach
- 2017: FC Wolfurt
- 2017–2019: FC Lustenau (sporting director)
- * Club domestic league appearances and goals

Christian Köll (born 15 October 1975) is an Austrian football manager and former footballer who played as a forward.
