= Jochen Gaudenzi =

Austrian footballer and manager

Personal information
- Date of birth: 9 June 1978 (age 48)
- Place of birth: Austria
- Height: 1.74 m (5 ft 8 1/2 in)
- Position: Midfielder

Youth career
- –1995: SV Wörgl

Senior career*
Years	Team	Apps	(Gls)
1995–2006	SV Wörgl	142	(17)
- * Club domestic league appearances and goals

Jochen Gaudenzi (born 9 June 1978) is an Austrian football manager and former footballer who played as a midfielder.
