= Mario Haas =

Austrian footballer (born 1974)

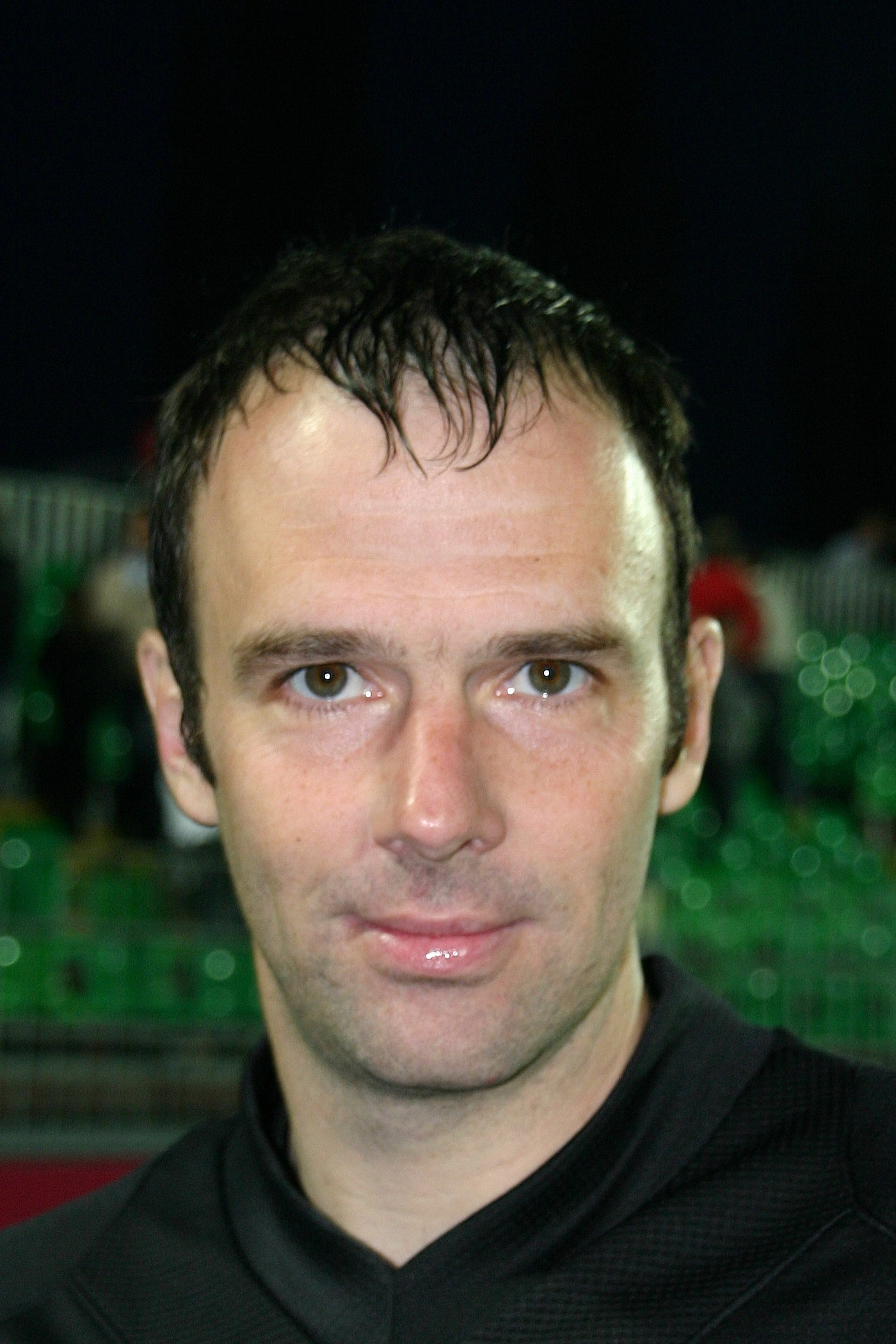
- Haas pictured in 2009

Personal information
- Date of birth: 16 September 1974 (age 52)
- Place of birth: Graz, Austria
- Height: 1.83 m (6 ft 0 in)
- Position: Forward

Youth career
- Sturm Graz

Senior career*
Years	Team	Apps	(Gls)
1992–1999	Sturm Graz	185	(66)
1999–2000	Strasbourg	27	(3)
2000–2005	Sturm Graz	114	(39)
2005–2006	JEF United Chiba	48	(11)
2006–2012	Sturm Graz	158	(42)
Total		532	(161)

International career
1998–2007	Austria	43	(7)
- * Club domestic league appearances and goals

Mario Haas (born 16 September 1974) is an Austrian former professional footballer who played as a forward. Apart from two short foreign engagements in France and Japan, he played most of his career with SK Sturm Graz. Haas also made 43 appearances for the Austria national football team, including at the 1998 World Cup in France.

== Career ==
=== Club career ===
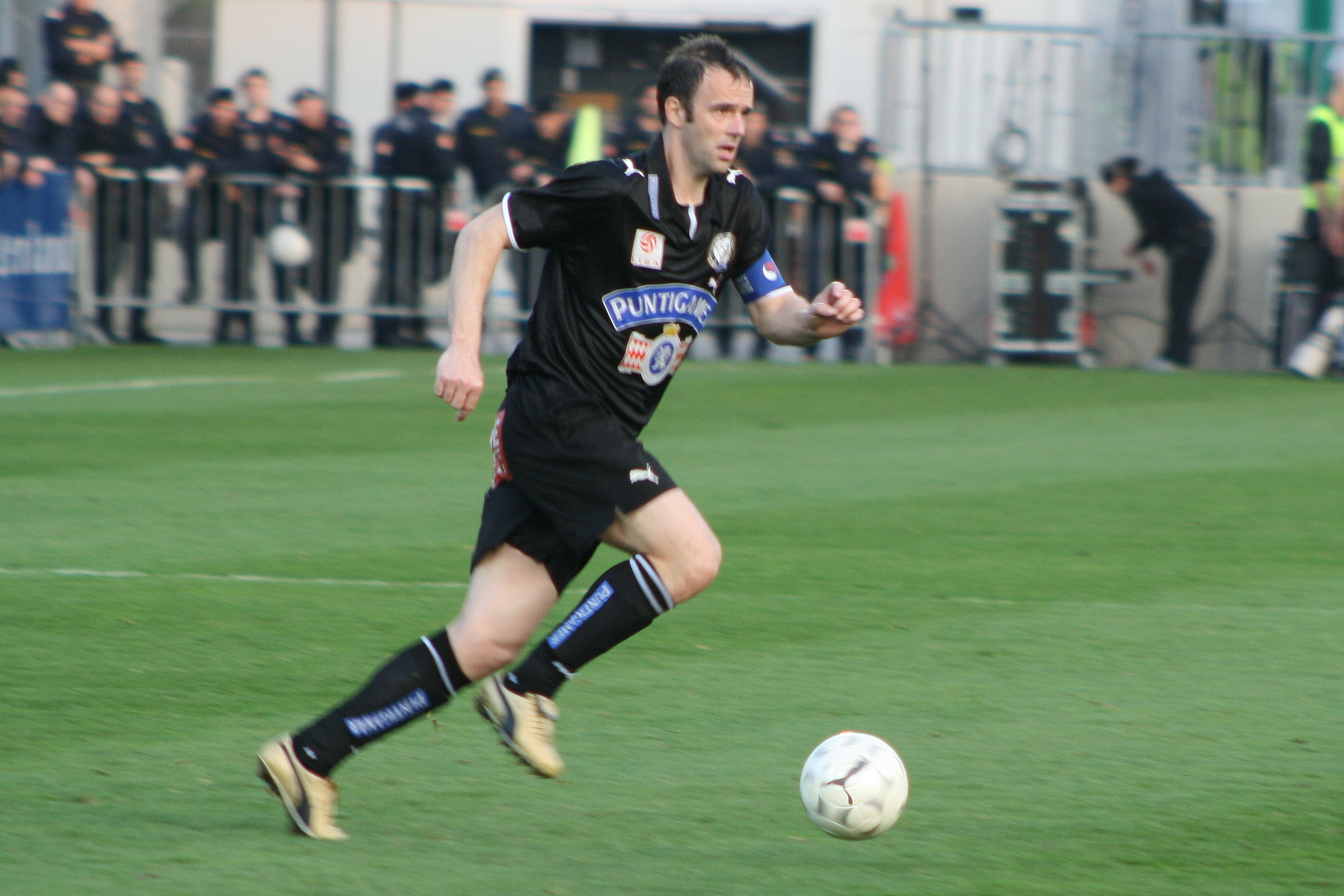
Haas in action with Sturm Graz

Mario Haas was active in SK Sturm Graz's youth section for ten years before playing his first game for the club's professionals in the spring of 1993. In the following years he played a major role in the two league titles in 1998 and 1999 and the three Austrian Cup victories in 1996, 1997 and 1999. Together with Ivica Vastić and Hannes Reinmayr he formed the so-called "magic triangle" of Sturm Graz during this successful period. In the summer of 1999, he decided to make his first move abroad, moving to France to join Racing Strasbourg. However, he was unable to establish himself there and therefore returned to his home club in the spring of 2001.

During the winter break of the 2004/05 season, his ex-coach Ivica Osim brought him to JEF United in the J1 League in Japan. He won the Japanese Cup with the club in both 2005 (the club's first ever trophy) and 2006. From the spring of 2007, Mario Haas played again for his regular club Sturm Graz, with whom he triumphed in the Austrian Cup for the fourth time in 2010. He was substituted in the match against Kapfenberger SV on February 12, 2011, marking his 412th appearance for SK Sturm Graz in the Bundesliga and making him the team's sole record holder ahead of Günther Neukirchner. At the end of the 2010/11 season, Haas became Austrian football champion with Sturm for the third time. Thus, Mario Haas was involved in all three league titles and four of five cup victories of Sturm Graz.

On December 1, 2012, Mario Haas ended his active career at the age of 38 during the match Sturm Graz vs. Wiener Neustadt (3:1). Today he runs his own football camps. He was coach of FC Bad Radkersburg, after the termination of his contract he became coach of USV Mettersdorf, but this contract was terminated after 5 defeats in a row.

At the general assembly of SK Sturm Graz on January 18, 2016, he was honored as honorary captain together with Günther Neukirchner and Andy Pichler.

=== National team ===
Haas made his debut for the Austria national team in an April 1998 friendly match against the United States and was a participant at the 1998 FIFA World Cup. He earned 43 caps, scoring seven goals. His last international was a May 2007 friendly match against Scotland. He was asked to play in Austria's squad in a friendly match against Turkey in November 2008, by Austria's coach Karel Brückner, but refused, saying that he wanted to concentrate on his job at Sturm Graz.

== Career statistics ==
=== Club ===
Appearances and goals by club, season and competition
Club	Season	League			National cup		League cup		Total	
Club	Season	Division	Apps	Goals	Apps	Goals	Apps	Goals	Apps	Goals
Sturm Graz	1992–93	Austrian Bundesliga	6	1					6	1
Sturm Graz	1993–94	Austrian Bundesliga	28	5					28	5
Sturm Graz	1994–95	Austrian Bundesliga	34	13					34	13
Sturm Graz	1995–96	Austrian Bundesliga	35	12	2	1			37	13
Sturm Graz	1996–97	Austrian Bundesliga	14	1	1	0			15	1
Sturm Graz	1997–98	Austrian Bundesliga	36	17	3	0			39	17
Sturm Graz	1998–99	Austrian Bundesliga	32	17	2	1			34	18
Sturm Graz	Total		185	66						
Strasbourg	1999–2000	Division 1	16	1					16	1
Strasbourg	2000–01	Division 1	11	2					11	2
Strasbourg	Total		27	3					27	3
Sturm Graz	2000–01	Austrian Bundesliga	14	4	2	0			16	4
Sturm Graz	2001–02	Austrian Bundesliga	30	12	2	0			32	12
Sturm Graz	2002–03	Austrian Bundesliga	20	6	2	0			22	6
Sturm Graz	2003–04	Austrian Bundesliga	34	10	2	0			36	10
Sturm Graz	2004–05	Austrian Bundesliga	16	7					16	7
Sturm Graz	Total		114	39						
JEF United Chiba	2005	J1 League	25	6	2	1	2	0	29	7
JEF United Chiba	2006	J1 League	23	5	0	0	8	5	31	10
JEF United Chiba	Total		48	11	2	1	10	5	60	17
Sturm Graz	2006–07	Austrian Bundesliga	15	4					15	4
Sturm Graz	2007–08	Austrian Bundesliga	35	14					35	14
Sturm Graz	2008–09	Austrian Bundesliga	35	15	4	0			39	15
Sturm Graz	2009–10	Austrian Bundesliga	17	1	4	1			21	2
Sturm Graz	2010–11	Austrian Bundesliga	31	5	3	1			34	6
Sturm Graz	2011–12	Austrian Bundesliga	24	2	2	2			26	4
Sturm Graz	2012–13	Austrian Bundesliga	1	0					1	0
Sturm Graz	Total		158	41						
Career total			532	160	31	7	10	5	573	172

=== International ===
Appearances and goals by national team and year
National team	Year	Apps	Goals
Austria	1996	1	0
Austria	1997	0	0
Austria	1998	10	2
Austria	1999	4	0
Austria	2000	1	0
Austria	2001	7	0
Austria	2002	0	0
Austria	2003	8	4
Austria	2004	6	1
Austria	2005	3	0
Austria	2006	0	0
Austria	2007	3	0
Total		43	7

== Honours ==
Sturm Graz

- Austrian Bundesliga: 1997–98, 1998–99, 2010–11
- Austrian Cup: 1995–96, 1996–97, 1998–99, 2009–10
- Austrian Supercup: 1996, 1997
- Top scorer: 1995, 1998, 1999, 2004, 2005, 2008, 2009
- Record player with 451 appearances

JEF United Chiba

- J.League Cup: 2005, 2006
