= 1997–98 Austrian Football Bundesliga =

80th season of top-tier football league in Austria

Austrian Bundesliga
- Season: 1997–98
- Champions: SK Sturm Graz

Statistics of Austrian Football Bundesliga in the 1997–98 season.

== Overview ==
It was contested by 10 teams, and SK Sturm Graz won the championship.

=== Teams and location ===
Location of teams in the 1997–98 Austrian Football Bundesliga

Teams of 1997–98 Austrian Football Bundesliga

- FC Admira/Wacker
- Austria Lustenau
- Austria Salzburg
- Austria Wien
- Grazer AK
- LASK
- Rapid Wien
- SV Ried
- Sturm Graz
- Tirol Innsbruck

== League standings ==
Pos	Team	Pld	W	D	L	GF	GA	GD	Pts	Qualification or relegation
1	Sturm Graz (C)	36	24	9	3	80	28	+52	81	Qualification to Champions League second qualifying round
2	Rapid Wien	36	18	8	10	42	36	+6	62	Qualification to UEFA Cup second qualifying round
3	Grazer AK	36	18	7	11	53	33	+20	61	Qualification to UEFA Cup second qualifying round
4	Austria Salzburg	36	16	8	12	48	33	+15	56	Qualification to Intertoto Cup second round
5	LASK Linz	36	17	4	15	67	58	+9	55	
6	Tirol Innsbruck	36	12	12	12	49	51	−2	48	
7	Austria Wien	36	10	10	16	39	54	−15	40	Qualification to Intertoto Cup first round
8	Ried	36	10	9	17	42	55	−13	39	Qualification to Cup Winners' Cup first round
9	Austria Lustenau	36	6	14	16	38	59	−21	32	
10	Admira Wacker Mödling (R)	36	5	7	24	34	85	−51	22	Relegation to Austrian First Football League

Source: weltfussball.de (in German)
(C) Champions; (R) Relegated

== Results ==
Teams played each other four times in the league. In the first half of the season each team played every other team twice (home and away), and then did the same in the second half of the season.

=== First half of season ===
Home \ Away	ADM	ALU	ASZ	AWI	GAK	LIN	RWI	RIE	STU	TIR
Admira Wacker Mödling		1–1	2–1	1–6	0–4	1–5	1–2	0–1	1–3	3–2
Austria Lustenau	5–0		2–0	0–0	0–1	4–1	0–0	0–2	1–1	1–1
Austria Salzburg	1–0	5–1		0–0	2–1	1–1	5–2	2–0	1–2	2–1
Austria Wien	3–0	3–1	2–1		1–0	3–0	0–3	3–0	1–1	0–4
Grazer AK	3–0	3–1	2–1	5–1		1–0	3–0	3–0	0–4	3–0
LASK Linz	1–0	1–0	1–1	4–1	2–2		2–0	1–1	2–0	4–2
Rapid Wien	0–0	1–0	0–3	2–0	1–1	3–1		3–0	0–2	1–0
Ried	3–1	1–1	2–0	0–1	0–0	1–4	2–2		1–1	2–0
Sturm Graz	4–0	6–0	1–0	0–0	2–1	4–1	1–0	2–0		2–0
Tirol Innsbruck	2–0	1–1	2–1	2–1	0–0	3–0	0–1	1–1	1–4	

Source: weltfussball.de (in German)
Legend: Blue = home team win; Yellow = draw; Red = away team win.

=== Second half of season ===
Home \ Away	ADM	ALU	ASZ	AWI	GAK	LIN	RWI	RIE	STU	TIR
Admira Wacker Mödling		3–0	0–0	1–1	1–4	0–3	0–1	1–1	2–4	2–4
Austria Lustenau	2–2		1–0	3–1	2–3	4–1	1–1	1–1	0–3	0–0
Austria Salzburg	4–0	2–0		0–0	0–0	2–1	1–0	1–0	1–1	1–1
Austria Wien	1–2	1–1	1–2		0–1	1–4	1–1	1–0	1–1	1–2
Grazer AK	2–1	1–0	0–2	1–0		1–3	0–1	3–0	0–0	1–2
LASK Linz	3–5	1–0	0–2	1–2	1–0		5–0	2–0	4–0	3–1
Rapid Wien	2–0	4–1	0–1	0–0	2–0	2–1		1–0	1–3	0–0
Ried	2–1	1–1	3–1	3–1	0–1	6–1	1–2		1–4	1–3
Sturm Graz	2–0	5–1	1–0	5–0	2–1	2–1	0–1	4–1		2–2
Tirol Innsbruck	2–2	1–1	2–1	2–0	1–1	2–1	0–2	1–4	1–1	

Source: weltfussball.de (in German)
Legend: Blue = home team win; Yellow = draw; Red = away team win.

== Top goalscorers ==
Rank	Scorer	Club	Goals
1	(Norway) Geir Frigård	LASK Linz	23
2	(Austria) Mario Haas	Sturm Graz	17
3	(Austria) Herfried Sabitzer	Grazer AK	15
3	(Austria) Hannes Reinmayr	Sturm Graz	15
5	(Austria) Ivica Vastić	Sturm Graz	14
6	(Austria) Gerald Strafner	SV Ried/Grazer AK	11
7	(Belgium) Francis Severeyns	Tirol Innsbruck	10
7	(Austria) Christian Mayrleb	Tirol Innsbruck	10
9	(Hungary) Tamás Tiefenbach	Austria Lustenau	9
9	(Austria) Eduard Glieder	Austria Salzburg	9
9	(Austria) Markus Weissenberger	LASK Linz	9
9	(Austria) Zeljko Radovic	Grazer AK	9

== Attendances ==
#	Football club	Average attendance
1	Sturm Graz	14,247
2	Austria Lustenau	9,859
3	LASK	9,228
4	Rapid Wien	9,167
5	Austria Salzburg	8,959
6	Grazer AK	8,759
7	Austria Wien	6,628
8	FC Tirol Innsbruck	5,822
9	SV Ried	5,333
10	Admira Wacker	3,047
