= Gerald Strafner =

Austrian footballer and manager

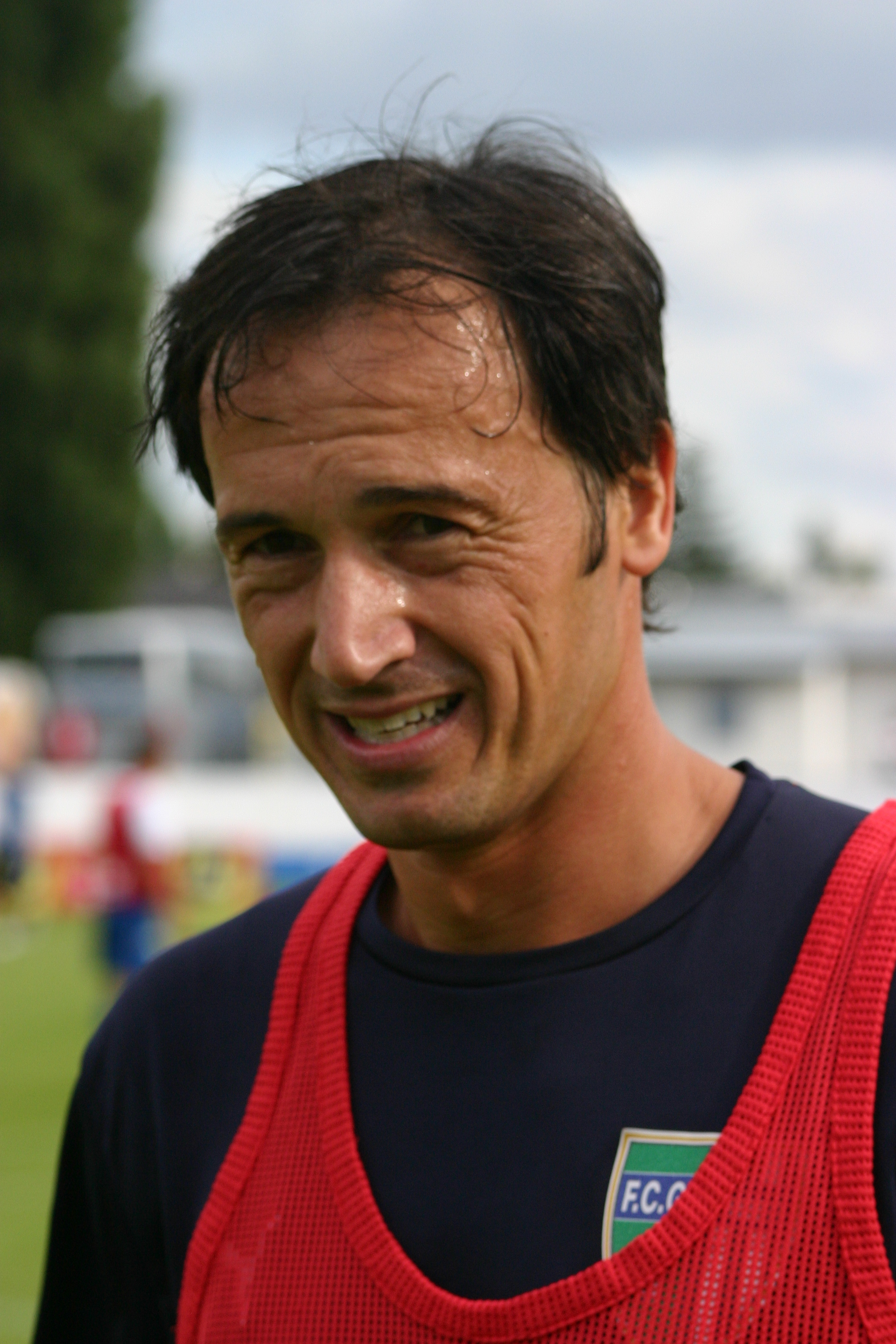
- Strafner in 2008

Personal information
- Date of birth: 3 June 1973 (age 53)
- Height: 1.82 m (6 ft 0 in)
- Position: Midfielder

Team information
- Current team: ASK Voitsberg
- Number: 7

Senior career*
Years	Team	Apps	(Gls)
?–1994	ASK Voitsberg		
1995–1996	Grazer AK	56	(9)
1997–1999	SV Ried	49	(13)
1999–2004	SK Sturm Graz	146	(9)
2004–2007	FC Kärnten	100	(6)
2007–2010	FC Gratkorn	58	(7)
2010–2012	ASK Voitsberg	42	(3)
2012–2013	ASK Köflach		

International career
2001	Austria	3	(0)

Managerial career
- 2010: ASK Voitsberg II
- 2013–2014: ASK Köflach
- * Club domestic league appearances and goals as of 03:33, 14 December 2008 (UTC)

Gerald Strafner (born 3 June 1973) is an Austrian football manager and former player who played as a midfielder.
