= 1998–99 Austrian Football Bundesliga =

81st season of top-tier football league in Austria

Austrian Bundesliga
- Season: 1998–99
- Champions: SK Sturm Graz

Statistics of Austrian Football Bundesliga in the 1998–99 season.

== Overview ==
It was contested by 10 teams, and SK Sturm Graz won the championship.

=== Teams and location ===
Location of teams in the 1998–99 Austrian Football Bundesliga

Teams of 1998-99 Austrian Football Bundesliga

- Austria Lustenau
- Austria Salzburg
- Austria Wien
- Grazer AK
- LASK
- Rapid Wien
- SV Ried
- Sturm Graz
- Tirol Innsbruck
- Vorwärts Steyr

== League standings ==
Pos	Team	Pld	W	D	L	GF	GA	GD	Pts	Qualification or relegation
1	Sturm Graz (C)	36	23	4	9	72	32	+40	73	Qualification to Champions League third qualifying round
2	Rapid Wien	36	19	13	4	50	25	+25	70	Qualification to Champions League second qualifying round
3	Grazer AK	36	20	5	11	46	29	+17	65	Qualification to UEFA Cup qualifying round
4	Austria Salzburg	36	15	12	9	55	40	+15	57	
5	LASK Linz	36	17	6	13	53	44	+9	57	Qualification to UEFA Cup first round
6	Tirol Innsbruck	36	15	10	11	49	41	+8	55	
7	Austria Wien	36	13	11	12	41	44	−3	50	Qualification to Intertoto Cup third round
8	Ried	36	8	8	20	25	47	−22	32	
9	Austria Lustenau	36	4	11	21	24	61	−37	23	Qualification to Intertoto Cup second round
10	Vorwärts Steyr (Note: 3 points deducted due to failure to meet license criteria) (R)	36	3	6	27	29	81	−52	12	Relegation to Austrian First Football League

Source: weltfussball.de (in German)
(C) Champions; (R) Relegated

== Results ==
Teams played each other four times in the league. In the first half of the season each team played every other team twice (home and away), and then did the same in the second half of the season.

=== First half of season ===
Home \ Away	ALU	ASZ	AUS	GAK	LIN	RWI	RIE	STU	TIR	VOR
Austria Lustenau		1–1	1–1	0–3	0–4	2–0	0–2	1–2	2–2	1–1
Austria Salzburg	1–2		2–0	1–0	1–3	1–1	3–2	1–1	1–1	5–2
Austria Wien	1–1	3–2		0–0	2–0	0–1	1–0	0–3	1–1	4–1
Grazer AK	4–0	3–1	0–0		0–2	1–1	1–0	0–5	2–0	2–0
LASK Linz	3–0	3–1	1–3	0–1		0–0	3–1	0–0	3–2	2–1
Rapid Wien	1–0	1–0	3–1	0–2	5–0		1–1	2–0	1–0	5–1
Ried	3–1	0–0	2–1	0–1	0–0	0–1		0–1	0–1	0–0
Sturm Graz	3–0	2–0	2–0	2–3	0–1	2–1	4–0		2–0	5–2
Tirol Innsbruck	3–1	1–1	3–0	1–1	1–4	1–3	1–0	0–1		3–2
Vorwärts Steyr	1–1	0–1	0–1	0–1	1–4	1–2	0–3	0–1	2–1	

Source: weltfussball.de (in German)
Legend: Blue = home team win; Yellow = draw; Red = away team win.

=== Second half of season ===
Home \ Away	ALU	ASZ	AUS	GAK	LIN	RWI	RIE	STU	TIR	VOR
Austria Lustenau		0–0	0–0	2–1	0–1	2–0	0–0	1–2	0–3	1–1
Austria Salzburg	1–0		3–0	3–0	2–0	0–0	0–0	3–1	2–2	1–0
Austria Wien	2–1	3–1		0–3	2–0	1–1	3–0	1–0	1–1	4–1
Grazer AK	2–0	1–4	3–0		2–1	0–1	1–0	1–2	0–1	1–0
LASK Linz	2–0	3–2	0–0	0–0		1–3	6–1	1–2	0–1	2–0
Rapid Wien	2–1	1–1	0–0	1–0	2–0		1–0	2–0	1–1	2–1
Ried	1–0	1–1	2–1	0–2	1–2	0–0		0–3	2–0	1–0
Sturm Graz	5–2	1–2	0–0	0–1	2–0	1–1	4–2		3–0	5–0
Tirol Innsbruck	0–0	0–3	4–1	1–0	4–0	0–0	1–0	3–1		4–0
Vorwärts Steyr	2–0	1–3	1–3	0–3	1–1	3–3	2–0	1–4	0–1	

Source: weltfussball.de (in German)
Legend: Blue = home team win; Yellow = draw; Red = away team win.

== Top goalscorers ==
Rank	Scorer	Club	Goals
1	(Austria) Eduard Glieder	Austria Salzburg	22
2	(Austria) Mario Haas	Sturm Graz	17
3	(Austria) Christian Mayrleb	Austria Wien	16
4	(Austria) Ivica Vastić	Sturm Graz	14
5	(Austria) Hannes Reinmayr	Sturm Graz	11
6	(Czech Republic) Rene Wagner	Rapid Wien	10
6	(Norway) Geir Frigård	LASK Linz	10
8	(Poland) Radosław Gilewicz	Tirol Innsbruck	8
8	(Austria) Michael Wagner	Austria Wien	8
10	(Austria) Gerald Strafner	SV Ried	7
10	(Netherlands) Samuel Koejoe	Austria Salzburg	7
10	(Austria) Marcus Pürk	Rapid Wien	7

== Attendances ==
#	Club	Average
1	Sturm	11,031
2	Salzburg	8,417
3	Rapid	8,317
4	LASK	8,056
5	Lustenau	7,761
6	GAK	7,175
7	Austria	5,800
8	Ried	4,444
9	Tirol	4,250
10	Steyr	3,394
