= SV Spittal/Drau =

Spittal/Drau
- Full name: Sportverein Spittal/Drau
- Founded: 1921
- Ground: Goldeck-Stadion
- Capacity: 6,500
- League: Kärntner Liga (IV)
- Website: http://www.svs.co.at/home.php
| Home colours | Away colours |

Sportverein Spittal/Drau is an Austrian association football club, based in Spittal an der Drau, Carinthia. The club founded in 1921 was promoted to the First League (II) in 1982 and won the championship of the 1983–84 season, however playing in the Bundesliga only until its immediate relegation in 1985. Spittal then became a long-term member of the First League until in 1999 the team slipped to the Austrian Regional League Central. In the 2008–09 season they finished 16th continuing their way down to the Kärntner Liga.

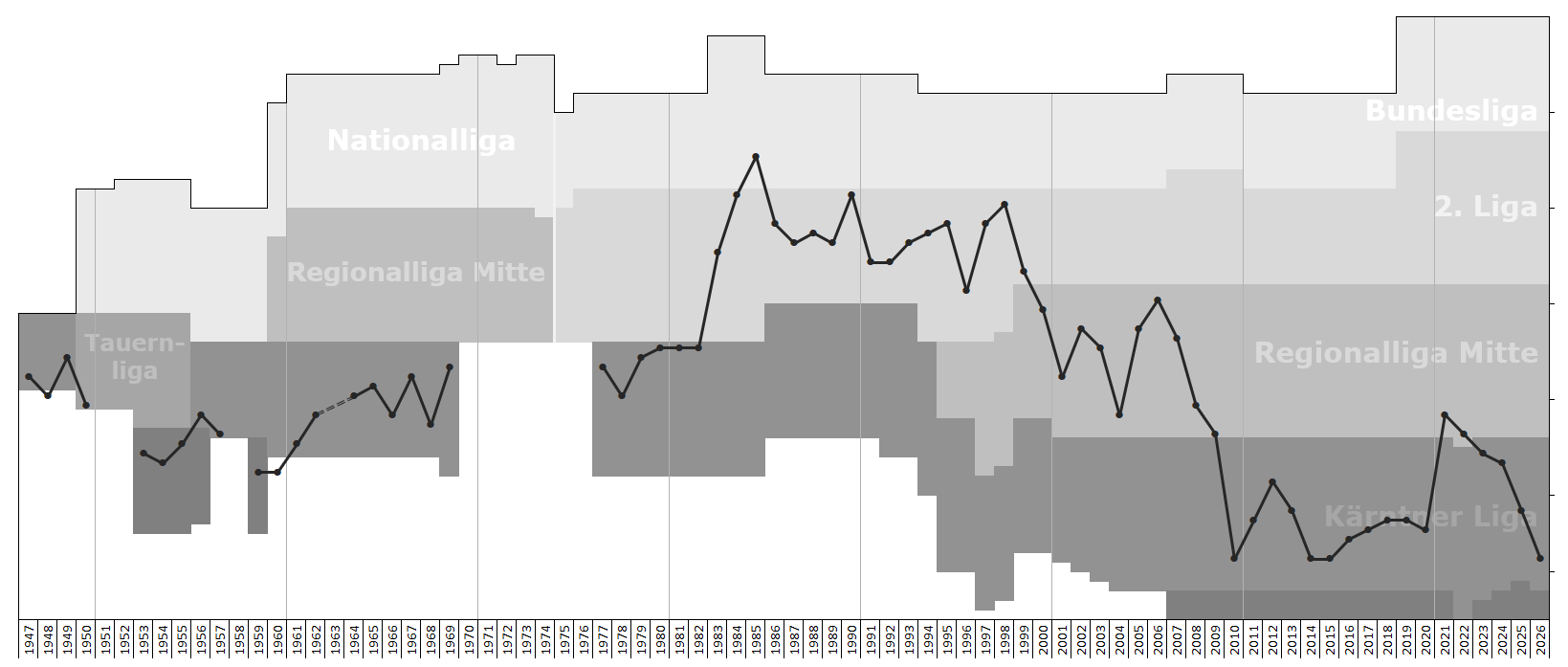
Historical chart of the club's league performance
