= FC Braunau =

- Founded: 1919

FC Braunau is a football team based in Braunau am Inn in Austria. Founded in 1919, they were previously known as SV Braunau – the name was changed in 2002 after going bankrupt. They formerly competed in the Erste Liga.
