= Austria national football team results (1980–1999) =

- Win Draw Loss

This is a list of the Austria national football team results from 1980 to 1999.

== 1980 ==
2 April International Friendly	West Germany	1–0	Austria	Munich, West Germany
	Müller 34'			Stadium: Olympiastadion; Attendance: 78,000; Referee: Michel Vautrot (France)

21 May International Friendly	Austria	1–5	Argentina	Vienna, Austria
	Jara 20'		Santamaría 2'; Luque 10'; Maradona 15', 75', 88'	Stadium: Praterstadion; Attendance: 72,000; Referee: André Daina (Switzerland)

4 June International Friendly	Hungary	1–1	Austria	Budapest, Hungary
	Kiss 12'		Jara 75'	Stadium: Népstadion; Attendance: 20,000; Referee: Riccardo Lattanzi (Italy)

24 September 1982 World Cup qualification Group 1	Finland	0–2	Austria	Helsinki, Finland
			Jara 14'; Welzl 77'	Stadium: Helsinki Olympic Stadium; Attendance: 8,099; Referee: Clive Thomas (Wales)

8 October International Friendly	Austria	3–1	Hungary	Vienna, Austria
	Welzl 20'; Keglevits 30', 85'		Bodonyi 80'	Stadium: Praterstadion; Attendance: 7,500; Referee: Ulf Eriksson (Sweden)

15 November 1982 World Cup qualification Group 1	Austria	5–0	Albania	Vienna, Austria
	Pezzey 19'; Schachner 26', 35'; Welzl 58'; Krankl 85'			Stadium: Praterstadion; Attendance: 31,000; Referee: Ruedi Renggli (Switzerland)

6 December 1982 World Cup qualification Group 1	Albania	0–1	Austria	Tirana, Albania
			Welzl 38'	Stadium: Qemal Stafa Stadium; Attendance: 16,000; Referee: László Pádár (Hungary)

== 1981 ==
29 April 1982 World Cup qualification Group 1	West Germany	2–0	Austria	Hamburg, West Germany
	Krauss 30' (o.g.); Fischer 36'			Stadium: Volksparkstadion; Attendance: 61,400; Referee: Charles Corver (Netherlands)

28 May 1982 World Cup qualification Group 1	Austria	2–0	Bulgaria	Vienna, Austria
	Krankl 30' (pen.); Jara 88'			Stadium: Praterstadion; Attendance: 55,000; Referee: Pat Partridge (England)

17 June 1982 World Cup qualification Group 1	Austria	5–1	Finland	Linz, Austria
	Prohaska 17', 19'; Krankl 48'; Jara 56'; Jurtin 64'		Valvee 71'	Stadium: Linzer Stadion; Attendance: 25,700; Referee: Alojzy Jarguz (Poland)

23 September International Friendly	Austria	0–0	Spain	Vienna, Austria
				Stadium: Praterstadion; Attendance: 15,000; Referee: Jozef Marko (Czechoslovakia)

14 October 1982 World Cup qualification Group 1	Austria	1–3	West Germany	Vienna, Austria
	Schachner 16'		Littbarski 17', 77'; Magath 20'	Stadium: Praterstadion; Attendance: 70,000; Referee: Alexis Ponnet (Belgium)

11 November 1982 World Cup qualification Group 1	Bulgaria	0–0	Austria	Sofia, Bulgaria
				Stadium: Vasil Levski National Stadium; Attendance: 30,000; Referee: Michel Vautrot (France)

== 1982 ==
24 March International Friendly	Hungary	2–3	Austria	Budapest, Hungary
	Várady 61'; Nyilasi 69'		Krankl 31'; Schachner 49'; Hattenberger 51'	Stadium: Népstadion; Attendance: 40,000; Referee: Egon Šoštarić (Yugoslavia)

28 April International Friendly	Austria	2–1	Czechoslovakia	Vienna, Austria
	Schachner 30', 43'		Jakubec 90'	Stadium: Praterstadion; Attendance: 16,000; Referee: Miklós Nagy (Hungary)

19 May International Friendly	Austria	1–0	Denmark	Vienna, Austria
	Degeorgi 4'			Stadium: Praterstadion; Attendance: 13,500; Referee: Bernd Stumpf (East Germany)

17 June 1982 FIFA World Cup; First Round Group 2	Austria	1–0	Chile	Oviedo, Spain
	Schachner 22'			Stadium: Carlos Tartiere Stadium; Attendance: 22,300; Referee: Juan Daniel Cardellino (Uruguay)

21 June 1982 FIFA World Cup; First Round Group 2	Algeria	0–2	Austria	Oviedo, Spain
			Schachner 56'; Krankl 68'	Stadium: Carlos Tartiere Stadium; Attendance: 22,000; Referee: Tony Boskovic (Australia)

25 June 1982 FIFA World Cup; First Round Group 2	Austria	0–1	West Germany	Gijón, Spain
			Hrubesch 11'	Stadium: El Molinón; Attendance: 41,000; Referee: Bob Valentine (Scotland)

28 June 1982 FIFA World Cup; Second Round Group D	Austria	0–1	France	Madrid, Spain
			Genghini 39'	Stadium: Vicente Calderón Stadium; Attendance: 20,000; Referee: Károly Palotai (Hungary)

1 July 1982 FIFA World Cup; Second Round Group D	Austria	2–2	Northern Ireland	Madrid, Spain
	Pezzey 51'; Hintermaier 68'		Hamilton 28', 75'	Stadium: Vicente Calderón Stadium; Attendance: 22,000; Referee: Adolf Prokop (East Germany)

22 September UEFA Euro 1984 qualifying Group 6	Austria	5–0	Albania	Wien, Austria
	Hagmayr 24'; Gasselich 41'; Kola 64' (o.g.); Weber 66'; Brauneder 81'			Stadium: Gerhard Hanappi Stadium; Attendance: 9,111; Referee: Yordan Zhezhov (Bulgaria)

13 October UEFA Euro 1984 qualifying Group 6	Austria	2–0	Northern Ireland	Vienna, Austria
	Schachner 3', 39'			Stadium: Praterstadion; Attendance: 9,885; Referee: Valeri Butenko (Soviet Union)

17 November UEFA Euro 1984 qualifying Group 6	Austria	4–0	Turkey	Wien, Austria
	Polster 10'; Pezzey 33'; Prohaska 36' (pen.); Schachner 52'			Stadium: Gerhard Hanappi Stadium; Attendance: 9,614; Referee: Aleksander Suchanek (Poland)

== 1983 ==
27 April UEFA Euro 1984 qualifying Group 6	Austria	0–0	West Germany	Vienna, Austria
				Stadium: Praterstadion; Attendance: 50,169; Referee: Brian McGinlay (Scotland)

17 May International Friendly	Austria	2–2	Soviet Union	Vienna, Austria
	Gasselich 28'; Pezzey 90'		Rodionov 35'; Blokhin 62'	Stadium: Praterstadion; Attendance: 15,000; Referee: Ulrich Nyffenegger (Switzerland)

8 June UEFA Euro 1984 qualifying Group 6	Albania	1–2	Austria	Tirana, Albania
	Targaj 83' (pen.)		Schachner 6', 58'	Stadium: Qemal Stafa Stadium; Attendance: 15,139; Referee: László Pádár (Hungary)

21 September UEFA Euro 1984 qualifying Group 6	Northern Ireland	3–1	Austria	Belfast, Northern Ireland
	Hamilton 28'; Whiteside 67'; O'Neill 89'		Gasselich 82'	Stadium: Windsor Park; Attendance: 18,013; Referee: Erik Fredriksson (Sweden)

5 October UEFA Euro 1984 qualifying Group 6	West Germany	3–0	Austria	Gelsenkirchen, West Germany
	Rummenigge 4'; Völler 19', 21'			Stadium: Parkstadion; Attendance: 65,496; Referee: Luigi Agnolin (Italy)

16 November UEFA Euro 1984 qualifying Group 6	Turkey	3–1	Austria	Istanbul, Turkey
	Tüfekçi 62'; Yula 69', 76'		Baumeister 72'	Stadium: Ali Sami Yen Stadium; Attendance: 21,310; Referee: Roger Schoeters (Belgium)

== 1984 ==
28 March International Friendly	France	1–0	Austria	Bordeaux, France
	Rocheteau 83'			Stadium: Parc Lescure; Attendance: 23,000; Referee: Viriato Graça Oliva (Portugal)

18 April International Friendly	Austria	0–0	Greece	Vienna, Austria
				Stadium: Gerhard Hanappi Stadium; Attendance: 9,700; Referee: Werner Föckler (West Germany)

2 May 1986 FIFA World Cup qualification Group 5	Cyprus	1–2	Austria	Nicosia, Cyprus
	Christoforou 72'		Gisinger 37'; Prohaska 75'	Stadium: Makario Stadium; Attendance: 3,455; Referee: Menachem Ashkenazi (Israel)

12 September International Friendly	Denmark	3–1	Austria	Copenhagen, Denmark
	Laudrup 36'; Christensen 67'; Eigenbrod 86'		Gisinger 47'	Stadium: Københavns Idrætspark; Attendance: 16,000; Referee: Ignace van Swieten (Netherlands)

26 September 1986 FIFA World Cup qualification Group 5	Hungary	3–1	Austria	Budapest, Hungary
	Nagy 50'; Esterházy 62'; Kardos 78'		Schachner 23'	Stadium: Népstadion; Attendance: 40,000; Referee: Michel Vautrot (France)

14 November 1986 FIFA World Cup qualification Group 5	Austria	1–0	Netherlands	Vienna, Austria
	Valke 15' (o.g.)			Stadium: Gerhard Hanappi Stadium; Attendance: 15,000; Referee: Anatoly Milchenko (USSR)

== 1985 ==
27 March International Friendly	Soviet Union	2–0	Austria	Tbilisi, USSR
	Demyanenko 40'; Protasov 48'			Stadium: Lenin Dinamo Stadium; Attendance: 21,500; Referee: Klaus Peschel (East Germany)

17 April UEFA Euro 1984 qualifying Group 6	Austria	0–3	Hungary	Vienna, Austria
			Kiprich 21', 34'; Détári 48'	Stadium: Gerhard Hanappi Stadium; Attendance: 22,000; Referee: Jacob Baumann (Switzerland)

1 May UEFA Euro 1984 qualifying Group 6	Netherlands	1–1	Austria	Rotterdam, Netherlands
	Kieft 55'		Schachner 60'	Stadium: De Kuip; Attendance: 58,000; Referee: Luigi Agnolin (Italy)

7 May UEFA Euro 1984 qualifying Group 6	Austria	4–0	Cyprus	Graz, Austria
	Hrstic 2'; Polster 36'; Schachner 54'; Willfurth 73'			Stadium: Liebenauer Stadium; Attendance: 15,000; Referee: Alan Snoddy (Northern Ireland)

16 October International Friendly	Austria	0–3	Yugoslavia	Linz, Austria
			Vujović 11', 64'; Mrkela 43'	Stadium: Linzer Stadion; Attendance: 14,500; Referee: Roger Schoeters (Belgium)

20 November International Friendly	Spain	0–0	Austria	Zaragoza, Spain
				Stadium: La Romareda; Attendance: 18,000; Referee: Claude Bouillet (France)

== 1986 ==
26 March International Friendly	Italy	2–1	Austria	Udine, Italy
	Altobelli 55'; Di Gennaro 76'		Polster 3'	Stadium: Stadio Friuli; Attendance: 28,182; Referee: Victoriano Sánchez Arminio (Spain)

14 May International Friendly	Austria	1–0	Sweden	Salzburg, Austria
	Kienast 51'			Stadium: Stadion Lehen; Attendance: 12,500; Referee: Henk van Ettekoven (Netherlands)

27 August UEFA Euro 1984 qualifying Group 6	Austria	1–1	Switzerland	Innsbruck, Austria
	Polster 8'		Bickel 50'	Stadium: Tivoli; Attendance: 8,030; Referee: Alphonse Costantin (Belgium)

10 September UEFA Euro 1988 qualifying Group 1	Romania	4–0	Austria	Bucharest, Romania
	Iovan 45', 64'; Lăcătuş 64'; Hagi 90'			Stadium: Stadionul Steaua; Attendance: 13,611; Referee: Gérard Biguet (France)

15 October UEFA Euro 1988 qualifying Group 1	Austria	3–0	Albania	Graz, Austria
	Ogris 18'; Polster 65'; Linzmaier 76'			Stadium: Liebenauer Stadium; Attendance: 5,456; Referee: Klaus Peschel (East Germany)

29 October International Friendly	Austria	4–1	West Germany	Vienna, Austria
	Polster 57' (pen.), 63' (pen.); Kienast 68', 76'		Völler 59'; Matthäus (yellow card) 63' (red card) 64'	Stadium: Praterstadion; Attendance: 50,000; Referee: Luigi Agnolin (Italy)

== 1987 ==
25 March International Friendly	Yugoslavia	4–0	Austria	Banja Luka, Yugoslavia
	Pančev 39', 80'; Stojković 56'; Tuce 75'			Stadium: Banja Luka City Stadium; Attendance: 18,000; Referee: Renzo Peduzzi (Switzerland)

1 April UEFA Euro 1988 qualifying Group 1	Austria	2–3	Spain	Vienna, Austria
	Linzmaier 39'; Polster 64'		Eloy 31', 64'; Carrasco 90'; Chendo (yellow card) 41' (red card) 76'	Stadium: Praterstadion; Attendance: 31,342; Referee: Bruno Galler (Switzerland)

29 April UEFA Euro 1988 qualifying Group 1	Albania	0–1	Austria	Tirana, Albania
	Kushta (red card) 83'		Polster 10'	Stadium: Qemal Stafa Stadium; Attendance: 17,250; Referee: Makis Germanakos (Greece)

18 August International Friendly	Switzerland	2–2	Austria	St. Gallen, Switzerland
	Bonvin 28'; Sutter 34'		Ogris 17'; Zsak 54'	Stadium: Espenmoos; Attendance: 9,000; Referee: Aron Schmidhuber (West Germany)

14 October UEFA Euro 1988 qualifying Group 1	Spain	2–0	Austria	Sevilla, Spain
	Míchel 56' (pen.); Sanchís 62'			Stadium: Ramón Sánchez Pizjuán Stadium; Attendance: 57,447; Referee: Joël Quiniou (France)

18 November UEFA Euro 1988 qualifying Group 1	Austria	0–0	Romania	Vienna, Austria
			Belodedici (yellow card) 88' (red card)	Stadium: Praterstadion; Attendance: 6,200; Referee: Rosario Lo Bello (Italy)

== 1988 ==
2 February 1988 Tournoi de France; Semi final	Morocco	3–1	Austria	Toulouse, France
	Lachabi 54'; El Gharef 56', 63'		Ogris 32'	Stadium: Stadium Municipal; Attendance: 15,000; Referee: Claude Bouillet (France)

5 February 1988 Tournoi de France; Third Place Play-Off	Switzerland	2–1	Austria	Monaco, France
	Koller 25'; Sutter 65'		Geiger 48' (o.g.)	Stadium: Stade Louis II; Attendance: 3,000; Referee: Michel Girard (France)

6 April International Friendly	Greece	2–2	Austria	Piraeus, Greece
	Saravakos 2'; Skartados 25'		Zsak 18'; Willfurth 58'	Stadium: Karaiskakis Stadium; Attendance: 6,000; Referee: Carlo Longhi (Italy)

27 April International Friendly	Austria	1–0	Denmark	Vienna, Austria
	Berggreen 13' (o.g.)			Stadium: Praterstadion; Attendance: 14,500; Referee: Manfred Neuner (West Germany)

17 May International Friendly	Hungary	0–4	Austria	Budapest, Hungary
			Marko 19', 80', 88'; Hasenhüttl 57'	Stadium: Népstadion; Attendance: 4,900; Referee: Adolf Prokop (East Germany)

3 August International Friendly	Austria	0–2	Brazil	Vienna, Austria
			Edmar 59'; Andrade 87'; Batista (red card) 65'	Stadium: Praterstadion; Attendance: 31,091; Referee: Lajos Németh (Hungary)

31 August International Friendly	Austria	0–0	Hungary	Linz, Austria
				Stadium: Linzer Stadion; Attendance: 12,000; Referee: Bo Karlsson (Sweden)

20 September International Friendly	Czechoslovakia	4–2	Austria	Prague, Czechoslovakia
	Luhový 12'; Bílek 48'; Daněk 69', 81'		Pacult 58'; Willfurth 90'	Stadium: Letenský stadion Attendance: 3,400; Referee: Siegfried Kirschen (East Germany)

19 October 1990 FIFA World Cup qualification UEFA Group 3	Soviet Union	2–0	Austria	Kiev, USSR
	Mykhaylychenko 46'; Zavarov 68'			Stadium: Kiev Republican Stadium; Attendance: 95,000; Referee: Rune Larsson (Sweden)

2 November 1990 FIFA World Cup qualification UEFA Group 3	Austria	3–2	Turkey	Vienna, Austria
	Polster 38'; Herzog 42', 54'		Uçar 61'; Çolak 81'	Stadium: Praterstadion; Attendance: 27,000; Referee: Tullio Lanese (Italy)

== 1989 ==
25 March International Friendly	Austria	0–1	Italy	Vienna, Austria
			Berti 88'	Stadium: Praterstadion; Attendance: 23,000; Referee: Manfred Neuner (West Germany)

11 April International Friendly	Austria	1–2	Czechoslovakia	Graz, Austria
	Herzog 71'		Griga 60', 77'	Stadium: Liebenauer Stadium; Attendance: 7,000; Referee: Pierluigi Pairetto (Italy)

20 May 1990 FIFA World Cup qualification UEFA Group 3	East Germany	1–1	Austria	Leipzig, East Germany
	Kirsten 87'		Polster 3'	Stadium: Zentralstadion; Attendance: 22,000; Referee: Alphonse Costantin (Belgium)

31 May International Friendly	Norway	4–1	Austria	Oslo, Norway
	Halle 33'; Fjørtoft 40'; Løken 55'; Kojedal 60'		Ogris 65'	Stadium: Ullevaal Stadion; Attendance: 2,084; Referee: Rune Larsson (Sweden)

14 June 1990 FIFA World Cup qualification UEFA Group 3	Iceland	0–0	Austria	Reykjavík, Iceland
				Stadium: Laugardalsvöllur; Attendance: 10,535; Referee: Howard King (Wales)

23 August 1990 FIFA World Cup qualification UEFA Group 3	Austria	2–1	Iceland	Salzburg, Austria
	Pfeifenberger 48'; Zsak 62'		Margeirsson 49'	Stadium: Stadion Lehen; Attendance: 16,000; Referee: Mikkelsen (Denmark)

6 September International Friendly	Austria	0–0	Soviet Union	Vienna, Austria
				Stadium: Praterstadion; Attendance: 62,500; Referee: Keith Hackett (England)

4 October International Friendly	Malta	1–2	Austria	Ta' Qali, Malta
	Zarb 15'		Glatzmayer 25'; Rodax 65'	Stadium: National Stadium, Ta' Qali; Attendance: 2,352; Referee: Carlo Longhi (Italy)

25 October 1990 FIFA World Cup qualification UEFA Group 3	Turkey	3–0	Austria	Istanbul, Turkey
	Dilmen 15', 53'; Uçar 62'			Stadium: Ali Sami Yen Stadium; Attendance: 33,465; Referee: Jozef Marko (Czechoslovakia)

15 November 1990 FIFA World Cup qualification UEFA Group 3	Austria	3–0	East Germany	Vienna, Austria
	Polster 2', 23' (pen.), 61'			Stadium: Praterstadion; Attendance: 55,000; Referee: Piotr Werner (Poland)

== 1990 ==
28 February International Friendly	Egypt	0–0	Austria	Cairo, Egypt
				Stadium: Cairo International Stadium; Attendance: 21,000; Referee: Claude Bouillet (France)

28 March International Friendly	Spain	2–3	Austria	Málaga, Spain
	Manolo 2'; Butragueño 33'		Hörtnagl 47'; Polster 65'; Rodax 89'	Stadium: La Rosaleda Stadium; Attendance: 26,000; Referee: Pietro D'Elia (Italy)

11 April International Friendly	Austria	3–0	Hungary	Salzburg, Austria
	Artner 18'; Ogris 42'; Keglevits 81'			Stadium: Stadion Lehen; Attendance: 7,000; Referee: Keith Hackett (England)

3 May International Friendly	Austria	1–1	Argentina	Vienna, Austria
	Zsak 3'		Burruchaga 31'	Stadium: Praterstadion; Attendance: 45,000; Referee: Alphonse Costantin (Belgium)

30 May International Friendly	Austria	3–2	Netherlands	Vienna, Austria
	Pecl 3'; Zsak 46'; Pfeffer 49'		Koeman 60' van Basten 84'	Stadium: Praterstadion; Attendance: 48,000; Referee: Manfred Roßner (East Germany)

9 June 1990 FIFA World Cup; Group A	Italy	1–0	Austria	Rome, Italy
	Schillaci 79'			Stadium: Stadio Olimpico; Attendance: 72,303; Referee: José Roberto Wright (Brazil)

15 June 1990 FIFA World Cup; Group A	Czechoslovakia	0–1	Austria	Florence, Italy
			Bílek 29' (pen.)	Stadium: Stadio Artemio Franchi; Attendance: 38,962; Referee: George Smith (Scotland)

19 June 1990 FIFA World Cup; Group A	Austria	2–1	United States	Florence, Italy
	Ogris 49'; Rodax 63'; Artner (red card) 34'		Murray 83'	Stadium: Stadio Artemio Franchi; Attendance: 34,857; Referee: Jamal Al Sharif (Syria)

21 August International Friendly	Austria	1–3	Switzerland	Vienna, Austria
	Ogris 28' (pen.)		Türkyilmaz 56', 62'; Knup 78'	Stadium: Praterstadion; Attendance: 7,100; Referee: Carlo Longhi (Italy)

12 September UEFA Euro 1992 qualifying Group 4	Faroe Islands	1–0	Austria	Landskrona, Sweden
	Nielsen 57'			Stadium: Landskrona IP; Attendance: 1,265; Referee: Egil Nervik (Norway)

31 October UEFA Euro 1992 qualifying Group 4	Yugoslavia	4–1	Austria	Belgrade, Yugoslavia
	Pančev 31', 52', 86'; Katanec 43'		Ogris 15'	Stadium: Red Star Stadium; Attendance: 11,422; Referee: Aron Schmidhuber (Germany)

14 November UEFA Euro 1992 qualifying Group 4	Austria	0–0	Northern Ireland	Vienna, Austria
				Stadium: Praterstadion; Attendance: 7,062; Referee: Gérard Biguet (France)

== 1991 ==
17 April International Friendly	Austria	0–0	Norway	Vienna, Austria
				Stadium: Praterstadion; Attendance: 36,000; Referee: Zdravko Đokić (Yugoslavia)

1 May International Friendly	Sweden	6–0	Austria	Stockholm, Sweden
	Andersson 12', 34', 87'; Rehn 38'; Dahlin 41', 59'			Stadium: Råsunda Stadium; Attendance: 3,689; Referee: Rune Pedersen (Norway)

22 May UEFA Euro 1992 qualifying Group 4	Austria	3–0	Faroe Islands	Salzburg, Austria
	Pfeifenberger 13'; Streiter 48'; Wetl 63'			Stadium: Stadion Lehen; Attendance: 13,000; Referee: Loizos Loizou (Cyprus)

5 June UEFA Euro 1992 qualifying Group 4	Denmark	2–1	Austria	Odense, Denmark
	Christensen 2', 78'		Ogris 82'	Stadium: Odense Stadium; Attendance: 12,521; Referee: Michał Listkiewicz (Poland)

4 September International Friendly	Portugal	1–1	Austria	Porto, Portugal
	Barros 31'		Kogler 70'	Stadium: Estádio das Antas; Attendance: 12,000; Referee: Raúl García de Loza (Spain)

9 October UEFA Euro 1992 qualifying Group 4	Austria	0–3	Denmark	Vienna, Austria
			Artner 10' (o.g.); Povlsen 16'; Christensen 37'	Stadium: Praterstadion; Attendance: 10,500; Referee: Frans van den Wijngaert (Belgium)

16 October UEFA Euro 1992 qualifying Group 4	Northern Ireland	2–1	Austria	Belfast, Northern Ireland
	Dowie 17'; Black 41'		Lainer 45'	Stadium: Windsor Park; Attendance: 8,000; Referee: Leif Sundell (Sweden)

13 November UEFA Euro 1992 qualifying Group 4	Austria	0–2	Yugoslavia	Vienna, Austria
			Lukić 19'; Savićević 39'	Stadium: Praterstadion; Attendance: 8,000; Referee: Pietro D'Elia (Italy)

== 1992 ==
25 March International Friendly	Hungary	2–1	Austria	Budapest, Hungary
	Détári 65'; Kovács 71'		Polster 40'	Stadium: Népstadion; Attendance: 7,500; Referee: Michał Listkiewicz (Poland)

14 April International Friendly	Austria	4–0	Lithuania	Vienna, Austria
	Ogris 21'; Prosenik 32'; Polster 37'; Hasenhüttl 82'			Stadium: Praterstadion; Attendance: 12,500; Referee: Haim Lipkovich (Israel)

29 April International Friendly	Austria	1–1	Wales	Vienna, Austria
	Baur 58'		Coleman 83'	Stadium: Praterstadion; Attendance: 52,000; Referee: Sándor Piller (Hungary)

19 May International Friendly	Austria	2–4	Poland	Salzburg, Austria
	Hasenhüttl 20'; Waldhör 68'		Kosecki 10', 33'; Warzycha 59'; Kowalczyk 64'	Stadium: Stadion Lehen; Attendance: 12,000; Referee: Marnix Sandra (Belgium)

27 May International Friendly	Netherlands	3–2	Austria	Sittard-Geleen, Netherlands
	Rijkaard 24'; Bergkamp 30'; Gullit 85'		Polster 32'; Schinkels 89'	Stadium: De Baandert; Attendance: 16,000; Referee: Rune Larsson (Sweden)

19 August International Friendly	Czechoslovakia	2–2	Austria	Bratislava, Czechoslovakia
	Chovanec 42'; Moravčík 90'		Stöger 17'; Pfeifenberger 22'	Stadium: Tehelné pole Attendance: 5,720; Referee: Kim Milton Nielsen (Denmark)

2 September International Friendly	Austria	1–1	Portugal	Linz, Austria
	Polster 37'		Hélder 56'	Stadium: Linzer Stadion; Attendance: 14,000; Referee: Piotr Werner (Poland)

14 October 1994 FIFA World Cup qualification UEFA Group 6	France	2–0	Austria	Paris, France
	Papin 3'; Cantona 77'			Stadium: Parc des Princes; Attendance: 39,186; Referee: Vadzim Zhuk (Belarus)

28 October 1994 FIFA World Cup qualification UEFA Group 6	Austria	5–2	Israel	Vienna, Austria
	Herzog 42', 45'; Polster 49'; Stöger 69'; Ogris 83'		Zohar 53', 76'	Stadium: Praterstadion; Attendance: 12,000; Referee: João Correira (Portugal)

18 November International Friendly	Germany	0–0	Austria	Nuremberg, Germany
	Kirsten (red card) 73'		Artner (red card) 73'	Stadium: Frankenstadion; Attendance: 46,000; Referee: Joe Worrall (England)

== 1993 ==
10 March International Friendly	Austria	2–1	Greece	Vienna, Austria
	Pfeifenberger 3'; Baur 14'		Machlas 38'	Stadium: Ernst-Happel-Stadion; Attendance: 30,000; Referee: László Molnár (Hungary)

27 March 1994 FIFA World Cup qualification UEFA Group 6	Austria	0–1	France	Vienna, Austria
			Papin 58'	Stadium: Ernst-Happel-Stadion; Attendance: 37,837; Referee: John Blankenstein (Netherlands)

14 April 1994 FIFA World Cup qualification UEFA Group 6	Austria	3–1	Bulgaria	Vienna, Austria
	Pfeifenberger 11'; Kühbauer 25'; Polster 90'		Ivanov 54'	Stadium: Ernst-Happel-Stadion; Attendance: 19,500; Referee: Sergey Husainov (Russia)

13 May 1994 FIFA World Cup qualification UEFA Group 6	Finland	3–1	Austria	Espoo, Finland
	Paatelainen 17'; Rajamäki 21'; Hjelm 51'		Zisser 90'	Stadium: Tapiolan Urheilupuisto; Attendance: 13,682; Referee: John Ferry (Northern Ireland)

19 May 1994 FIFA World Cup qualification UEFA Group 6	Sweden	1–0	Austria	Stockholm, Sweden
	Eriksson 49'			Stadium: Råsunda Stadium; Attendance: 27,775; Referee: Michel Piraux (Belgium)

25 August 1994 FIFA World Cup qualification UEFA Group 6	Austria	3–0	Finland	Vienna, Austria
	Kühbauer 28'; Pfeifenberger 41'; Herzog 90' (pen.)			Stadium: Ernst-Happel-Stadion; Attendance: 21,000; Referee: Michał Listkiewicz (Poland)

13 October 1994 FIFA World Cup qualification UEFA Group 6	Bulgaria	4–1	Austria	Sofia, Bulgaria
	Penev 6', 76'; Stoichkov 33' (pen.); Letchkov 87'		Herzog 51'	Stadium: Vasil Levski National Stadium; Attendance: 22,500; Referee: Marcello Nicchi (Italy)

27 October 1994 FIFA World Cup qualification UEFA Group 6	Israel	1–1	Austria	Ramat Gan, Israel
	Rosenthal 3'		Reinmayr 18'	Stadium: Ramat Gan Stadium; Attendance: 23,500; Referee: László Vágner (Bulgaria)

10 November 1994 FIFA World Cup qualification UEFA Group 6	Austria	1–1	Sweden	Vienna, Austria
	Herzog 70'		Mild 67'	Stadium: Ernst-Happel-Stadion; Attendance: 25,000; Referee: Manuel Díaz Vega (Spain)

== 1994 ==
23 March International Friendly	Austria	1–1	Hungary	Linz, Austria
	Pfeifenberger 75'		Illés 65'; Keresztúri (yellow card) 64' (red card) 68'; Ivanics (yellow card) 58' (red card) 71'	Stadium: Linzer Stadion; Attendance: 15,000; Referee: Walter Cinciripini (Italy)

20 April International Friendly	Austria	1–2	Scotland	Vienna, Austria
	Hütter 13'		McGinlay 34'; McKinlay 60'	Stadium: Ernst-Happel-Stadion; Attendance: 34,982; Referee: Hermann Albrecht (Germany)

17 May International Friendly	Poland	3–4	Austria	Katowice, Poland
	Juskowiak 22' (pen.); Brzęczek 47'; Moskal 89'		Stöger 5', 26', 64'; Hochmaier 68'	Stadium: Stadion GKS Katowice; Attendance: 4,000; Referee: Kurt Röthlisberger (Switzerland)

2 June International Friendly	Austria	1–5	Germany	Vienna, Austria
	Polster 77' (pen.)		Sammer 22'; Möller 50', 66'; Klinsmann 62'; Basler 90'	Stadium: Ernst-Happel-Stadion; Attendance: 35,000; Referee: Rémi Harrel (France)

17 August International Friendly	Austria	0–3	Russia	Klagenfurt, Austria
			Beschastnykh 43'; Nikiforov 53'; Simutenkov 83' (pen.)	Stadium: Wörthersee Stadion; Attendance: 9,300; Referee: Vassilios Nikakis (Greece)

7 September UEFA Euro 1996 qualifying Group 6	Liechtenstein	0–4	Austria	Eschen, Liechtenstein
			Polster 18', 45', 78'; Aigner 22'	Stadium: Sportpark Eschen-Mauren; Attendance: 5,800; Referee: Wieland Ziller (Germany)

12 October UEFA Euro 1996 qualifying Group 6	Austria	1–2	Northern Ireland	Vienna, Austria
	Polster 24' (pen.)		Gillespie 3'; Gray 36'	Stadium: Ernst-Happel-Stadion; Attendance: 20,000; Referee: Antonio Jesús López Nieto (Spain)

13 November UEFA Euro 1996 qualifying Group 6	Portugal	1–0	Austria	Lisbon, Portugal
	Figo 37'		Stöger (red card) 84'	Stadium: Estádio José Alvalade; Attendance: 30,000; Referee: Peter Mikkelsen (Denmark)

== 1995 ==
29 March UEFA Euro 1996 qualifying Group 6	Austria	5–0	Latvia	Salzburg, Austria
	Herzog 17', 59'; Pfeifenberger 41'; Polster 69' (pen.), 90'			Stadium: Stadion Lehen; Attendance: 5,200; Referee: Charles Agius (Malta)

26 April UEFA Euro 1996 qualifying Group 6	Austria	7–0	Liechtenstein	Salzburg, Austria
	Kühbauer 8'; Polster 11', 54' (pen.); Sabitzer 17'; Pürk 84'; Hütter 87', 89'			Stadium: Stadion Lehen; Attendance: 5,700; Referee: Vasyl Melnychuk (Ukraine)

11 June UEFA Euro 1996 qualifying Group 6	Republic of Ireland	1–3	Austria	Dublin, Republic of Ireland
	Houghton 66'		Polster 70', 80'; Ogris 74'	Stadium: Lansdowne Road; Attendance: 33,000; Referee: Markus Merk (Germany)

16 August UEFA Euro 1996 qualifying Group 6	Latvia	3–2	Austria	Riga, Latvia
	Rimkus 11', 59'; Zeiberliņš 88'		Polster 69'; Ramusch 78'	Stadium: Daugava Stadium; Attendance: 2,600; Referee: Ilkka Koho (Finland)

6 September UEFA Euro 1996 qualifying Group 6	Austria	3–1	Republic of Ireland	Vienna, Austria
	Stöger 4', 64', 77'		McGrath 74'	Stadium: Ernst-Happel-Stadion; Attendance: 24,000; Referee: Ahmet Çakar (Turkey)

11 October UEFA Euro 1996 qualifying Group 6	Austria	1–1	Portugal	Vienna, Austria
	Stöger 21'		Paulinho Santos 49'	Stadium: Ernst-Happel-Stadion; Attendance: 44,800; Referee: Nikolai Levnikov (Russia)

15 November UEFA Euro 1996 qualifying Group 6	Northern Ireland	5–3	Austria	Belfast, Northern Ireland
	O'Neill 27', 78'; Dowie 32' (pen.); Hunter 53'; Gray 64'		Schopp 56'; Stumpf 70'; Wetl 81'	Stadium: Windsor Park; Attendance: 8,400; Referee: Leif Sundell (Sweden)

== 1996 ==
27 March International Friendly	Austria	1–0	Switzerland	Vienna, Austria
	Ogris 74'			Stadium: Ernst-Happel-Stadion; Attendance: 23,800; Referee: Fernand Meese (Belgium)

24 April International Friendly	Hungary	0–2	Austria	Budapest, Hungary
			Polster 12'; Marasek 68'	Stadium: Népstadion; Attendance: 4,000; Referee: Ľuboš Micheľ (Slovakia)

29 May International Friendly	Austria	1–0	Czech Republic	Salzburg, Austria
	Wetl 86'			Stadium: Stadion Lehen; Attendance: 5,100; Referee: Mike Reed (England)

31 August 1998 FIFA World Cup qualification UEFA Group 4	Austria	0–0	Scotland	Vienna, Austria
				Stadium: Ernst-Happel-Stadion; Attendance: 29,500; Referee: Michel Piraux (Belgium)

9 October 1998 FIFA World Cup qualification UEFA Group 4	Sweden	0–1	Austria	Stockholm, Sweden
			Herzog 12'	Stadium: Råsunda Stadium; Attendance: 36,859; Referee: Václav Krondl (Czech Republic)

9 November 1998 FIFA World Cup qualification UEFA Group 4	Austria	2–1	Latvia	Vienna, Austria
	Polster 43'; Herzog 73'		Vīts Rimkus 45'; Stepanovs (yellow card) 53' (red card) 62'	Stadium: Ernst-Happel-Stadion; Attendance: 15,700; Referee: Milan Mitrović (Slovenia)

== 1997 ==
18 March International Friendly	Austria	0–2	Slovenia	Linz, Austria
			Gliha 74'; Šiljak 84'	Stadium: Linzer Stadion; Attendance: 14,500; Referee: Vladimír Hriňák (Slovakia)

24 April 1998 FIFA World Cup qualification UEFA Group 4	Scotland	2–0	Austria	Glasgow, Scotland
	Gallacher 25', 78'			Stadium: Celtic Park; Attendance: 43,259; Referee: Nikolai Levnikov (Russia)

30 April 1998 FIFA World Cup qualification UEFA Group 4	Austria	2–0	Estonia	Vienna, Austria
	Vastić 48'; Stöger 87'			Stadium: Ernst-Happel-Stadion; Attendance: 27,500; Referee: Amand Ancion (Belgium)

8 June 1998 FIFA World Cup qualification UEFA Group 4	Latvia	1–3	Austria	Riga, Latvia
	Astafjevs 87'; Pahars (yellow card) 35' (red card) 39'		Heraf 55'; Polster 81'; Stöger 82'	Stadium: Daugava Stadium; Attendance: 9,200; Referee: Dick Jol (Netherlands)

20 August 1998 FIFA World Cup qualification UEFA Group 4	Estonia	0–3	Austria	Tallinn, Estonia
			Polster 47', 70', 90'	Stadium: Kadriorg Stadium; Attendance: 2,200; Referee: Giorgos Fasolis (Greece)

6 September 1998 FIFA World Cup qualification UEFA Group 4	Austria	1–0	Sweden	Vienna, Austria
	Herzog 76'; Pfeffer (yellow card) 31' (red card) 41'; Konsel (red card) 82'		Nilsson (red card) 69'	Stadium: Ernst-Happel-Stadion; Attendance: 48,500; Referee: Antonio Jesús López Nieto (Spain)

10 September 1998 FIFA World Cup qualification UEFA Group 4	Belarus	0–1	Austria	Minsk, Belarus
			Pfeifenberger 50'	Stadium: Dinamo Stadium; Attendance: 7,000; Referee: Serge Muhmenthaler (Switzerland)

6 September 1998 FIFA World Cup qualification UEFA Group 4	Austria	4–0	Belarus	Vienna, Austria
	Polster 3', 16' (pen.); Stöger 6', 42'			Stadium: Ernst-Happel-Stadion; Attendance: 48,500; Referee: Aron Huzu (Romania)

== 1998 ==
25 March International Friendly	Austria	2–3	Hungary	Vienna, Austria
	Vastić 10'; Amerhauser 21'		Horváth 4'; Illés 32', 54'	Stadium: Ernst-Happel-Stadion; Attendance: 21,000; Referee: Markus Merk (Germany)

22 April International Friendly	Austria	0–3	United States	Vienna, Austria
			Hejduk 55'; McBride 89'; Reyna 90+2'	Stadium: Ernst-Happel-Stadion; Attendance: 17,000; Referee: Attila Hanacsek (Hungary)

27 May International Friendly	Austria	2–1	Tunisia	Vienna, Austria
	Cerny 11'; Wetl 17'		Badra 23'	Stadium: Ernst-Happel-Stadion; Attendance: 12,000; Referee: Jacek Granat (Poland)

2 June International Friendly	Austria	6–0	Liechtenstein	Vienna, Austria
	Polster 5', 93'; Kühbauer 27'; Stöger 68', 75'; Haas 91'		Hefti (yellow card) 7' (red card)	Stadium: Ernst-Happel-Stadion; Attendance: 11,000; Referee: Bohdan Benedik (Slovakia)

11 June 1998 FIFA World Cup; Group B	Austria	1–1	Cameroon	Toulouse, France
	Polster 90+1'		Njanka 77'	Stadium: Stade de Toulouse; Attendance: 33,460; Referee: Epifanio González (Paraguay)

17 June 1998 FIFA World Cup; Group B	Chile	1–1	Austria	Saint-Étienne, France
	Salas 70'		Vastić 90+2'	Stadium: Stade Geoffroy-Guichard; Attendance: 30,600; Referee: Gamal Al-Ghandour (Egypt)

10 September 1998 FIFA World Cup; Group B	Austria	1–2	Italy	Paris, France
	Herzog 90' (pen.)		Vieri 49'; Baggio 89'	Stadium: Stade de France; Attendance: 80,000; Referee: Paul Durkin (England)

19 August International Friendly	Austria	2–2	France	Vienna, Austria
	Haas 42'; Vastić 76' (pen.)		Laslandes 16'; Boghossian 84'	Stadium: Ernst-Happel-Stadion; Attendance: 44,000; Referee: Mario van der Ende (Netherlands)

5 September UEFA Euro 2000 qualifying Group 6	Austria	1–1	Israel	Vienna, Austria
	Reinmayr 7'		Nimni 68' (pen.); Amsalem (red card) 58'	Stadium: Ernst-Happel-Stadion; Attendance: 20,000; Referee: Anders Frisk (Netherlands)

10 October UEFA Euro 2000 qualifying Group 6	Cyprus	0–3	Austria	Larnaca, Cyprus
	Ioannou (yellow card) 4' (red card) 33'		Cerny 53', 61'; Reinmayr 75'	Stadium: Antonis Papadopoulos Stadium; Attendance: 11,000; Referee: Fernand Meese (Belgium)

14 October UEFA Euro 2000 qualifying Group 6	San Marino	1–4	Austria	Serravalle, San Marino
	Selva 81' (pen.)		Vastić 59'; Mayrleb 64'; Hiden 69'; Glieder 76'	Stadium: San Marino Stadium; Attendance: 1,218; Referee: Valeriy Onufer (Ukraine)

== 1999 ==
10 March International Friendly	Switzerland	2–4	Austria	St. Gallen, Switzerland
	Vogel 24' (pen.); Feiersinger 50' (o.g.)		Herzog 1', 57' (pen.); Neukirchner 33'; Reinmayr 44'	Stadium: Espenmoos; Attendance: 9,000; Referee: Luc Huyghe (Belgium)

27 March UEFA Euro 2000 qualifying Group 6	Spain	9–0	Austria	Seville, Spain
	Raúl 6', 17', 47', 75'; Urzaiz 30', 44'; Hierro 35' (pen.); Wetl 76' (o.g.); Fran 84'			Stadium: Mestalla Stadium; Attendance: 45,000; Referee: Gilles Veissière (France)

28 April UEFA Euro 2000 qualifying Group 6	Austria	7–0	San Marino	Graz, Austria
	Mayrleb 24', 53'; Vastić 42', 44', 84'; Amerhauser 71'; Herzog 82' (pen.)			Stadium: Arnold Schwarzenegger Stadion; Attendance: 15,400; Referee: Kyros Vassaras (Greece)

6 June UEFA Euro 2000 qualifying Group 6	Israel	5–0	Austria	Ramat Gan, Israel
	Berkovic 27', 47'; Revivo 45'; Mizrahi 53'; Ghrayib 75'			Stadium: Ramat Gan Stadium; Attendance: 43,000; Referee: Ľuboš Micheľ (Slovakia)

18 August International Friendly	Sweden	0–0	Austria	Malmö, Sweden
	Osmanovski (red card) 45'			Stadium: Malmö Stadion; Attendance: 12,222; Referee: Claus Bo Larsen (Denmark)

4 September UEFA Euro 2000 qualifying Group 6	Austria	1–3	Spain	Vienna, Austria
	Hierro 49' (o.g.)		Raúl 22'; Hierro 56'; Luis Enrique 88'	Stadium: Ernst-Happel-Stadion; Attendance: 27,000; Referee: Michel Piraux (Belgium)

10 October UEFA Euro 2000 qualifying Group 6	Austria	3–1	Cyprus	Vienna, Austria
	Glieder 5'; Vastić 23'; Herzog 81'; Ibertsberger (red card) 76'		Costa 63'	Stadium: Ernst-Happel-Stadion; Attendance: 10,000; Referee: Livio Bazzoli (Italy)

== Appearances and goals ==
Name	Club(s)	Total	
Name	Club(s)	Apps	Goals
Christian Keglevits	SK Rapid Wien; Wiener Sport-Club; SV Casino Salzburg	18	3
Friedl Koncilia	FK Austria Wien	32	0
Hans Krankl	SK Rapid Wien; First Vienna FC; FC Barcelona	21	5
Bernd Krauss	SK Rapid Wien; Borussia Mönchengladbach	22	0
Wilhelm Kreuz	SK VÖEST Linz	4	0
Hans-Dieter Mirnegg	MSV Duisburg; Como 1907	10	0
Ernst Baumeister	FK Austria Wien; FC Admira/Wacker	32	1
Erich Obermayer	FK Austria Wien	25	0
Bruno Pezzey	Eintracht Frankfurt; SV Werder Bremen; FC Swarovski Tirol	43	4
Herbert Prohaska	Inter Milan; FK Austria Wien; A.S. Roma	40	4
Walter Schachner	AC Cesena; FK Austria Wien; Torino F.C. A.C. Pisa 1909; U.S. Avellino; DSV Leoben	44	16
Heribert Weber	SK Rapid Wien; SV Casino Salzburg	42	1
Kurt Welzl	Valencia CF; AZ Alkmaar	14	5
Johann Dihanich	FK Austria Wien	10	0
Herbert Feurer	SK Rapid Wien	7	0
Felix Gasselich	FK Austria Wien; AFC Ajax	16	3
Max Hagmayr	SK VÖEST Linz; Karlsruher SC	8	1
Roland Hattenberger	FC Wacker Innsbruck; VfB Stuttgart	20	1
Reinhold Hintermaier	1. FC Nürnberg	14	1
Kurt Jara	FC Schalke 04; Grasshopper Club Zürich; MSV Duisburg	18	4
Gernot Jurtin	SK Sturm Graz	11	1
Andy Pichler	SK Sturm Graz	10	0
Günther Pospischil	FK Austria Wien	3	0
Johann Pregesbauer	SK Rapid Wien	9	0
Robert Sara	FK Austria Wien	1	0
Gerhard Steinkogler	SV Werder Bremen; FK Austria Wien	3	0
Helmut Wartinger	SK VÖEST Linz	1	0
Mario Zuenelli	Grazer AK	2	0
Arnold Koreimann	FC Wacker Innsbruck	1	0
Leo Lainer	SK Rapid Wien; SV Casino Salzburg	28	1
Klaus Lindenberger	Linzer ASK; FC Swarovski Tirol	41	0
Peter Pacult	Wiener Sport-Club; SK Rapid Wien; FC Swarovski Tirol; TSV 1860 Munich	24	1
Toni Polster	FK Austria Wien; Torino F.C. Sevilla FC; CD Logroñés; Rayo Vallecano; 1. FC Köln	94	44
Karl Brauneder	Wiener Sport-Club; SK Rapid Wien	20	1
Josef Degeorgi	FC Admira/Wacker; FK Austria Wien	30	1
Günther Golautschnig	SK Austria Klagenfurt	1	0
Reinhard Kienast	SK Rapid Wien	13	3
Gerald Messlender	FC Admira/Wacker; FC Swarovski Tirol	14	0
Heinz Thonhofer	SK Sturm Graz	1	0
Gerald Willfurth	SK Rapid Wien; SV Casino Salzburg	30	3
Martin Gisinger	FC St. Gallen	7	2
Richard Niederbacher	K.S.V. Waregem	4	0
Alfred Drabits	FK Austria Wien	7	0
Andreas Gretschnig	FC Wacker Innsbruck; FC Zürich	2	0
Walter Hörmann	SK Sturm Graz; FC St. Gallen; FK Austria Wien	15	0
Manfred Kern	FC Admira/Wacker	3	0
Michael Konsel	SK Rapid Wien; A.S. Roma	43	0
Manfred Linzmaier	FC Swarovski Tirol	23	2
Franz Oberacher	SK Austria Klagenfurt	2	0
Gerhard Rodax	FC Admira/Wacker; Atlético Madrid	20	3
Rudolf Steinbauer	Grazer AK; FC Swarovski Tirol	3	0
Ewald Türmer	FK Austria Wien	7	0
Peter Hrstic	SK Rapid Wien	3	1
Andreas Ogris	FK Austria Wien; RCD Espanyol; Linzer ASK	63	11
Gerald Piesinger	Linzer ASK	6	0
Andreas Spielmann	FC Swarovski Tirol	1	0
Rudi Weinhofer	SK Rapid Wien	4	0
Jürgen Werner	SK VÖEST Linz	13	0
Manfred Zsak	FC Admira/Wacker; FK Austria Wien	49	5
Robert Pecl	SK Rapid Wien	31	1
Alfred Roscher	FC Swarovski Tirol	1	0
Franz Wohlfahrt	FK Austria Wien; VfB Stuttgart	44	0
Robert Frind	FK Austria Wien	5	0
Peter Artner	FC Admira/Wacker; SV Casino Salzburg	55	2
Daniel Madlener	SK Vorwärts Steyr	2	0
Rupert Marko	FC Swarovski Tirol	3	3
Anton Pfeffer	FK Austria Wien	63	1
Kurt Russ	First Vienna FC; FC Swarovski Tirol	28	0
Peter Schöttel	SK Rapid Wien	62	0
Peter Stöger	FK Austria Wien; First Vienna FC; FC Tirol Innsbruck; SK Rapid Wien; Linzer ASK	65	15
Gerald Glatzmeyer	First Vienna FC	6	1
Ralph Hasenhüttl	Grazer AK; FK Austria Wien; SV Casino Salzburg	8	3
Andreas Herzog	SK Rapid Wien; First Vienna FC; SV Werder Bremen; FC Bayern Munich	75	18
Otto Konrad	SK Sturm Graz; SV Casino Salzburg	12	0
Heimo Pfeifenberger	SK Rapid Wien; SV Casino Salzburg; SV Werder Bremen	40	9
Andreas Reisinger	Wiener Sport-Club; SK Rapid Wien	8	0
Ernst Aigner	FC Admira/Wacker; FK Austria Wien	10	0
Michael Streiter	FC Swarovski Tirol; FC Wacker Innsbruck; FK Austria Wien	34	1
Christoph Westerthaler	FC Swarovski Tirol	6	0
Alfred Hörtnagl	FC Swarovski Tirol	15	1
Michael Baur	FC Swarovski Tirol; FC Wacker Innsbruck	23	2
Heinz Peischl	FC Swarovski Tirol	3	0
Andreas Poiger	SK Rapid Wien	1	0
Wolfgang Feiersinger	SV Casino Salzburg; Borussia Dortmund	46	1
Jürgen Hartmann	FC Swarovski Tirol; FC Wacker Innsbruck	8	0
Wolfgang Knaller	FC Admira/Wacker	4	0
Walter Kogler	SK Sturm Graz; FK Austria Wien; SV Casino Salzburg; FC Tirol Innsbruck	25	1
Ernst Ogris	FC Admira/Wacker	1	1
Christian Prosenik	FK Austria Wien; SV Casino Salzburg; SK Rapid Wien	24	1
Franz Resch	SK Rapid Wien	2	0
Leopold Rotter	VSE St. Pölten	6	0
Harald Schneider	FK Austria Wien	1	0
Arnold Wetl	SK Sturm Graz; FC Porto; SK Rapid Wien	21	5
Herbert Gager	SK Rapid Wien	4	0
Kurt Garger	SV Casino Salzburg	1	0
Harald Gschnaidtner	FC Stahl Linz	1	0
Dietmar Kühbauer	FC Admira/Wacker; SK Rapid Wien; Real Sociedad	37	4
Roman Mählich	Wiener Sport-Club; SK Sturm Graz	19	0
Mario Posch	FC Swarovski Tirol; Bayer 05 Uerdingen	2	0
Herfried Sabitzer	SV Casino Salzburg; Linzer ASK; Grazer AK	6	1
Frank Schinkels	VSE St. Pölten; SV Casino Salzburg	6	1
Walter Waldhör	SK Vorwärts Steyr	2	1
Robert Wazinger	FC Wacker Innsbruck	5	0
Thomas Flögel	FK Austria Wien	9	0
Roland Kirchler	FC Wacker Innsbruck; FC Tirol Innsbruck	5	0
Hannes Reinmayr	MSV Duisburg; SK Sturm Graz	14	4
Thomas Winklhofer	SV Casino Salzburg	9	0
Michael Zisser	FC Admira/Wacker	1	1
Harald Cerny	FC Bayern Munich; FC Admira/Wacker; FC Tirol Innsbruck; TSV 1860 Munich	34	3
Thomas Janeschitz	Wiener Sport-Club	1	0
Johann Kogler	FC Admira/Wacker	7	0
Franz Aigner	SV Casino Salzburg	6	1
Thomas Weissenberger	Linzer ASK	1	0
Christian Fürstaller	SV Casino Salzburg	5	0
Walter Hochmaier	Linzer ASK	3	1
Adolf Hütter	SV Casino Salzburg	14	3
Stephan Marasek	SK Rapid Wien; SC Freiburg	11	1
Marcus Pürk	SK Rapid Wien	1	1
Dieter Ramusch	Linzer ASK; Grazer AK	10	1
Markus Schopp	SK Sturm Graz; Hamburger SV	22	1
Christian Stumpf	SK Rapid Wien	2	1
Goran Kartalija	Linzer ASK	4	0
Richard Kitzbichler	FC Tirol Innsbruck; SV Casino Salzburg	2	0
Ivica Vastić	SK Sturm Graz	25	9
Mario Haas	SK Sturm Graz; RC Strasbourg	15	2
Michael Hatz	SK Rapid Wien; A.C. Reggiana	4	0
Andreas Heraf	SK Rapid Wien	11	1
Gilbert Prilasnig	SK Sturm Graz	5	0
Christian Mayrleb	FK Austria Wien	11	3
Günther Neukirchner	SK Sturm Graz	6	1
Martin Amerhauser	SV Casino Salzburg	6	2
Edi Glieder	SV Casino Salzburg	5	2
Martin Hiden	Leeds United	7	1
Jürgen Kauz	Linzer ASK	2	0
Zoran Barisic	FC Tirol Innsbruck	1	0
Alex Manninger	Arsenal	3	0
Klaus Rohseano	Linzer ASK	1	0
Markus Weissenberger	Arminia Bielefeld	3	0
Gerd Wimmer	SK Rapid Wien	2	0
Robert Ibertsberger	SV Casino Salzburg	3	0
