= 1988 Tournoi de France =

Tournament details
- Host country: France and Monaco
- Dates: 2 – 5 February
- Teams: 4
- Venues: 2 (in 2 host cities)

Final positions
- Champions: France (1st title)
- Runners-up: Morocco

Tournament statistics
- Matches played: 4
- Goals scored: 13 (3.25 per match)
- Top scorer(s): (Switzerland) Alain Sutter (Morocco) Moulay El Gharef (2 goals)

The Tournoi de France (French, 'Tournament of France') was a friendly international football tournament held in France in early February 1988. Four national teams participated in the competition: Austria, Morocco, hosts France, and Switzerland.

It was a knockout tournament played over three days in Toulouse and Monaco. The final and third-place play-off were held in Monaco, which is a country independent of France.

== Overview ==
The four participating nations—Austria, France, Morocco, and Switzerland—entered the tournament in the following contexts: Austria had failed to qualify for the 1986 FIFA World Cup or UEFA Euro 1988, finishing third out of four in qualifying Group 1. France, the host nation, had finished third at the 1986 World Cup in Mexico and, despite being the reigning European champions, had also failed to qualify for Euro 1988, finishing third out of five in qualifying Group 3. Morocco entered the tournament after achieving its best World Cup performance in Mexico, where West Germany eliminated it in the round of 16. Furthermore, it had finished fourth at the 1986 Africa Cup of Nations. Morocco viewed this tournament as preparation for the 1988 Africa Cup of Nations, which it would host. Switzerland did not qualify for the 1986 FIFA World Cup nor for Euro 1988, finishing fourth out of five in qualifying group 2.

== Results ==
Semi-finals
2 February
Morocco	3
Austria	1
2 February
France	2
Switzerland	1

Final
5 February
France	2
Morocco	1
Third place
5 February
Switzerland	2
Austria	1

== Semi-finals ==
2 February 1988

Morocco	3–1	Austria
Lachabi 54'; El Gharef 56', 63'		Ogris 32'

Stadium Municipal, Toulouse
Attendance: 15,000
Referee: Claude Bouillet (FRA)

2 February 1988

France	2–1	Switzerland
Passi 7'; Fargeon 9'		Sutter 19'

Stadium Municipal, Toulouse
Attendance: 10,348
Referee: Gérard Biguet (FRA)

== Third place play-off ==
5 February 1988

Switzerland	2–1	Austria
Koller 25'; Sutter 65'		Geiger 48' (o.g.)

Stade Louis II, Monaco
Attendance: 3,000
Referee: Michel Girard (FRA)

== Final ==
5 February 1988

France	2–1	Morocco
Lamriss 9' (o.g.); Stopyra 49'		Lamriss 34'

Stade Louis II, Monaco
Attendance: 10,000
Referee: Michel Vautrot (FRA)

1988 Tournoi de France

France
First title

== Statistics ==
=== Goalscorers ===
There were 13 goals scored in 4 matches, for an average of 3.25 goals per match.

2 goals

- (Switzerland) Alain Sutter
- (Morocco) Moulay El Gharef

1 goal

- (Austria) Andreas Ogris
- (France) Gérald Passi
- (France) Philippe Fargeon
- (France) Yannick Stopyra
- (Morocco) Abdelmajid Lamriss
- (Morocco) Mohammed Lachabi
- (Switzerland) Marcel Koller

1 own goal

- (Morocco) Abdelmajid Lamriss (against France)
- (Switzerland) Alain Geiger (against Austria)

== See also ==
- Tournoi de France
- 1997 Tournoi de France
