= Ogris =

Ogris is a surname. Notable people with the surname include:

- Andreas Ogris (born 1964), Austrian footballer and manager
- Ernst Ogris (1967–2017), Austrian footballer
