= Harald Schneider =

Harald Schneider may refer to:

- Harald Schneider (footballer)
- Harald Schneider (politician)

== See also ==
- Harold K. Schneider, American scholar od economic anthropology
