= 1990 FIFA World Cup qualification – UEFA Group 3 =

Football tournament qualification stage

The 1990 FIFA World Cup qualification UEFA Group 3 was a UEFA qualifying group for the 1990 FIFA World Cup. The group comprised Austria, East Germany, Iceland, the Soviet Union and Turkey.

The group was won by the Soviet Union, who qualified for the 1990 FIFA World Cup. Austria also qualified as runners-up.

== Standings ==
| Pos | Team | Pld | W | D | L | GF | GA | GD | Pts | Qualification | Soviet Union national football team | Austria national football team | Turkey national football team | East Germany national football team | Iceland national football team |
|---|---|---|---|---|---|---|---|---|---|---|---|---|---|---|---|
| 1 | Soviet Union | 8 | 4 | 3 | 1 | 11 | 4 | +7 | 11 | Qualification to 1990 FIFA World Cup | — | 2–0 | 2–0 | 3–0 | 1–1 |
| 2 | Austria | 8 | 3 | 3 | 2 | 9 | 9 | 0 | 9 | Qualification to 1990 FIFA World Cup | 0–0 | — | 3–2 | 3–0 | 2–1 |
| 3 | Turkey | 8 | 3 | 1 | 4 | 12 | 10 | +2 | 7 | | 0–1 | 3–0 | — | 3–1 | 1–1 |
| 4 | East Germany | 8 | 3 | 1 | 4 | 9 | 13 | −4 | 7 | | 2–1 | 1–1 | 0–2 | — | 2–0 |
| 5 | Iceland | 8 | 1 | 4 | 3 | 6 | 11 | −5 | 6 | | 1–1 | 0–0 | 2–1 | 0–3 | — |

=== Results ===
31 August 1988

| Iceland | 1 – 1 | Soviet Union |
|---|---|---|
| Grétarsson 10' | (Report) | Lytovchenko 75' |

Laugardalsvöllur, Reykjavík
Attendance: 7,982
Referee: Alan Snoddy (Northern Ireland)

12 October 1988

| Turkey | 1 – 1 | Iceland |
|---|---|---|
| Ünal Karaman 73' | (Report) | Torfason 62' |

İnönü Stadium, Istanbul
Attendance: 25,680
Referee: Ovadia Ben Itzhak (Israel)

19 October 1988

| Soviet Union | 2 – 0 | Austria |
|---|---|---|
| Mykhaylychenko 46'; Zavarov 68' | (Report) |

Republican Stadium, Kyiv
Attendance: 95,000
Referee: Rune Larsson (Sweden)
19 October 1988

| East Germany | 2 – 0 | Iceland |
|---|---|---|
| Thom 34', 88' | (Report) |

Friedrich-Ludwig-Jahn-Sportpark, Berlin
Attendance: 12,300
Referee: Einar Halle (Norway)

2 November 1988

| Austria | 3 – 2 | Turkey |
|---|---|---|
| Polster 38'; Herzog 42', 54' | (Report) | Uçar 61'; Çolak 81' |

Prater Stadium, Vienna
Attendance: 27,000
Referee: Tullio Lanese (Italy)

30 November 1988

| Turkey | 3 – 1 | East Germany |
|---|---|---|
| Çolak 23', 63'; Çetin 69' | (Report) | Thom 76' |

İnönü Stadium, Istanbul
Attendance: 42,000
Referee: Lajos Németh (Hungary)

12 April 1989

| East Germany | 0 – 2 | Turkey |
|---|---|---|
| | (Report) | Çolak 21'; Dilmen 88' |

Ernst Grube Stadium, Magdeburg
Attendance: 23,000
Referee: Jan Damgaard (Denmark)

26 April 1989

| Soviet Union | 3 – 0 | East Germany |
|---|---|---|
| Dobrovolski 3'; Lytovchenko 20'; Protasov 40' | (Report) |

Republican Stadium, Kyiv
Attendance: 100,000
Referee: Douglas Hope (Scotland)

10 May 1989

| Turkey | 0 – 1 | Soviet Union |
|---|---|---|
| | (Report) | Mykhaylychenko 41' |

İnönü Stadium, Istanbul
Attendance: 45,000
Referee: Michel Vautrot (France)

20 May 1989

| East Germany | 1 – 1 | Austria |
|---|---|---|
| Kirsten 86' | (Report) | Polster 3' |

Zentralstadion, Leipzig
Attendance: 22,000
Referee: Alphonse Constantin (Belgium)

31 May 1989

| Soviet Union | 1 – 1 | Iceland |
|---|---|---|
| Dobrovolski 65' | (Report) | Akselsson 86' |

Lenin Stadium, Moscow
Attendance: 60,654
Referee: Timo Keltonen (Finland)

14 June 1989

| Iceland | 0 – 0 | Austria |
|---|---|---|
| | (Report) |

Laugardalsvöllur, Reykjavík
Attendance: 10,535
Referee: Howard King (Wales)

23 August 1989

| Austria | 2 – 1 | Iceland |
|---|---|---|
| Pfeifenberger 47'; Zsak 62' | (Report) | Margeirsson 48' |

Stadion Lehen, Salzburg
Attendance: 16,000
Referee: Peter Mikkelsen (Denmark)

6 September 1989

| Austria | 0 – 0 | Soviet Union |
|---|---|---|
| | (Report) |

Prater Stadium, Vienna
Attendance: 62,500
Referee: Keith Hackett (England)
6 September 1989

| Iceland | 0 – 3 | East Germany |
|---|---|---|
| | (Report) | Sammer 55'; Ernst 63'; Doll 65' |

Laugardalsvöllur, Reykjavík
Attendance: 7,124
Referee: Keith Cooper (Wales)

20 September 1989

| Iceland | 2 – 1 | Turkey |
|---|---|---|
| Pétursson 56', 72' | (Report) | Uçar 85' |

Laugardalsvöllur, Reykjavík
Attendance: 3,451
Referee: José Pérez Sánchez (Spain)

8 October 1989

| East Germany | 2 – 1 | Soviet Union |
|---|---|---|
| Thom 81'; Sammer 83' | (Report) | Lytovchenko 74' |

Ernst-Thälmann Stadium, Karl-Marx-Stadt
Attendance: 15,900
Referee: Bo Helén (Sweden)

25 October 1989

| Turkey | 3 – 0 | Austria |
|---|---|---|
| Dilmen 12', 52'; Uçar 60' | (Report) |

Ali Sami Yen Stadium, Istanbul
Attendance: 33,465
Referee: Josef Marko (Czechoslovakia)

15 November 1989

| Soviet Union | 2 – 0 | Turkey |
|---|---|---|
| Protasov 68', 79' | (Report) |

Lokomotiv Stadium, Simferopol
Attendance: 28,000
Referee: Dieter Pauly (West Germany)
15 November 1989

| Austria | 3 – 0 | East Germany |
|---|---|---|
| Polster 2', 23' (pen.), 61' | (Report) |

Prater Stadium, Vienna
Attendance: 55,000
Referee: Piotr Werner (Poland)

== Goalscorers ==
There were 47 goals scored during the 20 games, an average of 2.35 goals per game.

5 goals

- (Austria) Toni Polster
- (Turkey) Tanju Çolak

4 goals

- (East Germany) Andreas Thom

3 goals

- (Soviet Union) Hennadiy Lytovchenko
- (Soviet Union) Oleh Protasov
- (Turkey) Rıdvan Dilmen
- (Turkey) Feyyaz Uçar

2 goals

- (Austria) Andreas Herzog
- (East Germany) Matthias Sammer
- (Iceland) Pétur Pétursson
- (Soviet Union) Igor Dobrovolski
- (Soviet Union) Oleksiy Mykhaylychenko

1 goal

- (Austria) Heimo Pfeifenberger
- (Austria) Manfred Zsak
- (East Germany) Thomas Doll
- (East Germany) Rainer Ernst
- (East Germany) Ulf Kirsten
- (Iceland) Atli Eðvaldsson
- (Iceland) Sigurður Grétarsson
- (Iceland) Ragnar Margeirsson
- (Iceland) Guðmundur Torfason
- (Soviet Union) Oleksandr Zavarov
- (Turkey) Oğuz Çetin
