= Tournoi de France =

- Organiser(s): French Football Federation (FFF)
- Founded: 1988
- Abolished: 1997
- Teams: 4 teams
- Last champions: England
- Most championships: France and England (1)

The Tournoi de France (French, 'Tournament of France') was a friendly international football tournament organised by the French Football Federation (FFF) that was held in France. There have been two tournaments: the first in February 1988 and the second in June 1997 (as a warm-up to the 1998 FIFA World Cup). Austria, Switzerland, Morocco and hosts France were the four participants of the first edition that was won by France after beating Morocco 2–1 in the final; and Italy, Brazil, England and hosts France were the four participants of the second edition, which was won by England with 6 points.

== Results ==
Year	Winner	Runner-up	Third place	Top scorer	Goals
1988	France	Morocco	Switzerland	(Switzerland) Alain Sutter (Morocco) Moulay El Gharef	2 goals
1997	England	Brazil	France	(Italy) Alessandro Del Piero	3 goals

== Top scorers ==
Rank	Player	Team	Goals	Tournaments
1	Alessandro Del Piero	Italy	3	1997
2	Alain Sutter	Switzerland	2	1988
2	Moulay El Gharef	Morocco	2	1988
2	Romário	Brazil	2	1997

== See also ==
- Tournoi de France (women's football)
- Cyprus International Football Tournament
- Malta International Football Tournament
