= Stade Louis II =

Stadium in Fontvieille, Monaco

Coordinates: 43°43′39″N 7°24′56″E

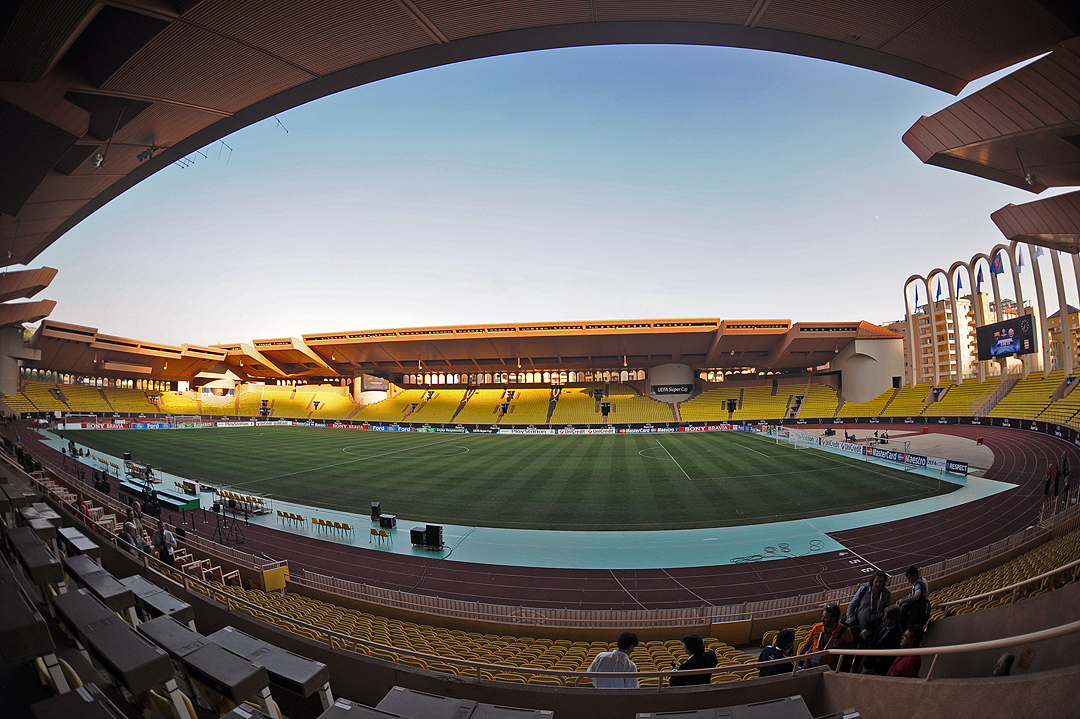
- UEFA
- Interactive map of Stade Louis II
- Location: 7, avenue des Castelans; 98000 Fontvieille, Monaco
- Owner: Monaco
- Operator: Monaco
- Capacity: 16,360
- Surface: Hybrid pitch
- Scoreboard: Yes
- Record attendance: 20,000 (AS Monaco vs U.C. Sampdoria, 3 April 1990)
- Field size: 105 × 68 metres (344 ft × 223 ft)
- Field shape: Oval (Track and field / Stands)
- Public transit: Routes 4, 6, and N1, Autobus de Monaco; Routes 600 and 601, ZOU! Région Sud; Monaco-Monte-Carlo station

Construction
- Built: May 1981 (current)
- Opened: 1939 (original); 25 January 1985 (current)
- Architects: Henry Pottier, Philippe Godin, Jacques Rechsteiner, Rainier Boisson, Joseph Iori

Tenants
- AS Monaco (Ligue 1) (1985–present); Herculis (IAAF Diamond League) (1987–present); UEFA Super Cup (1998-2012)

Website
- http://www.stadelouis2.mc/

The Stade Louis II (French pronunciation: [stad(ə) lwi dø], lit. 'Louis II Stadium'), or simply Louis II, is a stadium located in the Fontvieille district of Monaco, near the border with Cap-d'Ail commune of France. It serves primarily as a venue for Athletics and football, being the home of AS Monaco. The stadium is most notable for its distinctive nine arches at the away end of the ground. The arena is also used for the Herculis, a track and field meet of the Diamond League. The stadium hosted the 1986 and 1998–2012 UEFA Super Cup matches. Due to Monaco's small size, the stadium is the only football and athletics stadium in the country.

== History ==
The original Stade Louis II was opened in 1939 as the home of AS Monaco. The decision to build a new sports centre in Monaco dates back to 1979. Prince Rainier III decided to establish a sports area in the Fontvieille district. The prince brought in Parisian architects to build the complex. The work began in May 1981 and ended in 1984, and required 120,000 m³ of concrete, 9,000 tonnes of iron and 2,000 tonnes of steel structure on a median land reclaimed from the sea. The complex was inaugurated on 25 January 1985 by Rainier III.

The stadium has a current seating capacity of 16,360 (almost half of the country's population), and is named after Louis II, Prince of Monaco, who was the Sovereign Prince of Monaco when the original stadium was built. The vast majority of the stadium's facilities are located underground, including the Gaston-Médecin multi-sports centre, the Prince Albert II aquatic centre and a large car park directly under the pitch.

The stadium has hosted major professional boxing world title fights from time to time; those include the Julio César Chávez, Sr. versus Rocky Lockridge contest.

The stadium also hosts the cup finals of the Challenge Prince Rainier III, Monaco's main competition for Monegasque amateur company football teams.

The stadium hosted the athletics events in the 1987 and 2007 Games of the Small States of Europe, and is scheduled to host it again in the 2027 event.

== Facilities ==
The Salle Gaston Médecin indoor arena is located under the stands of the football stadium. Salle Gaston Médecin is able to host basketball, volleyball, and handball games, as well as judo and fencing matches, and weightlifting and gymnastics competitions. It has a seating capacity of 5,000 people for basketball games and concerts.

The stadium complex, besides the football stadium and athletics track and the Salle Gaston Médecin, also contains the aquatic centre Prince Albert II, a large office complex, and also houses the International University of Monaco (IUM), which specializes in business education.

== Gallery ==
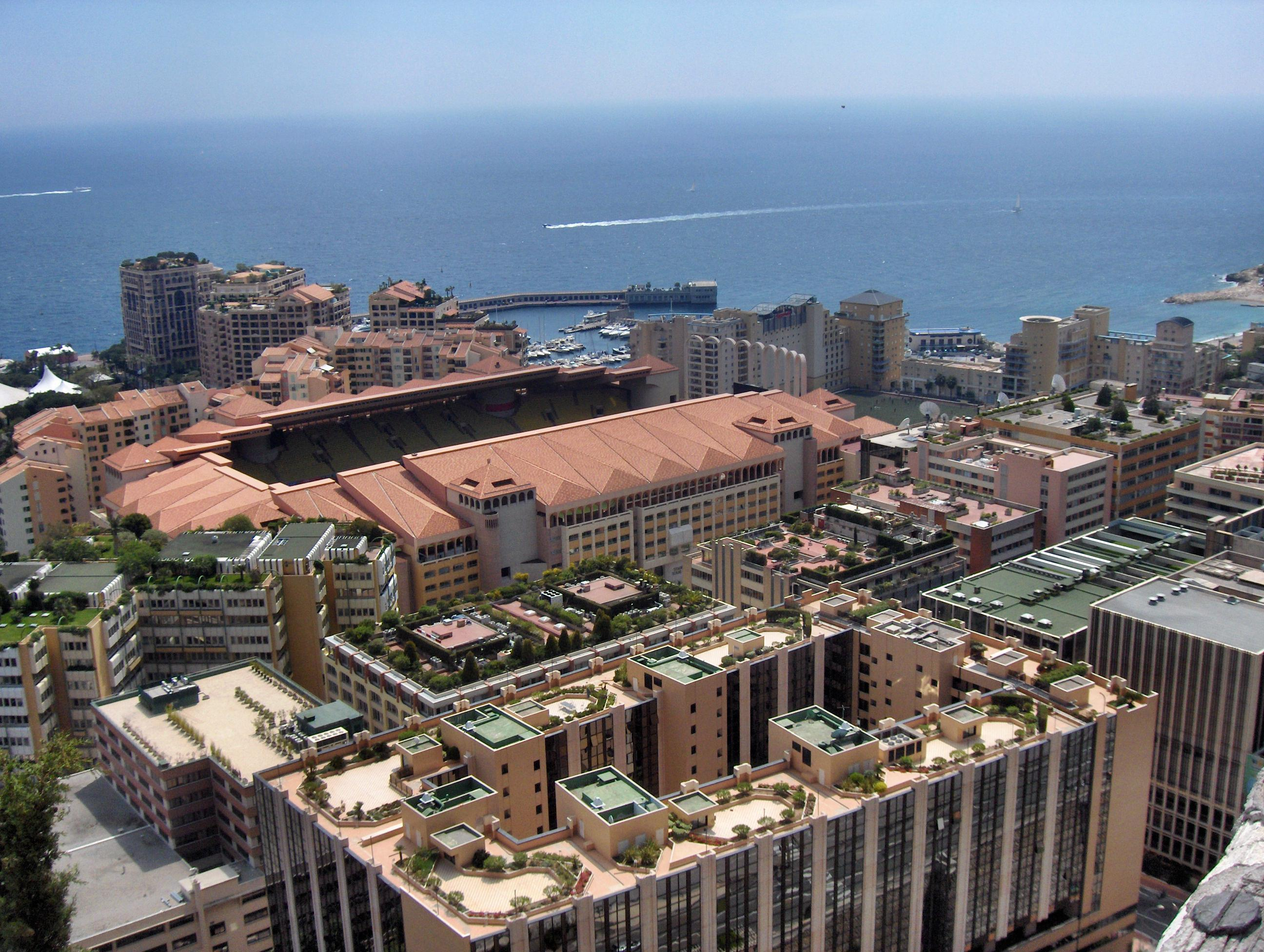
A top view of the stadium

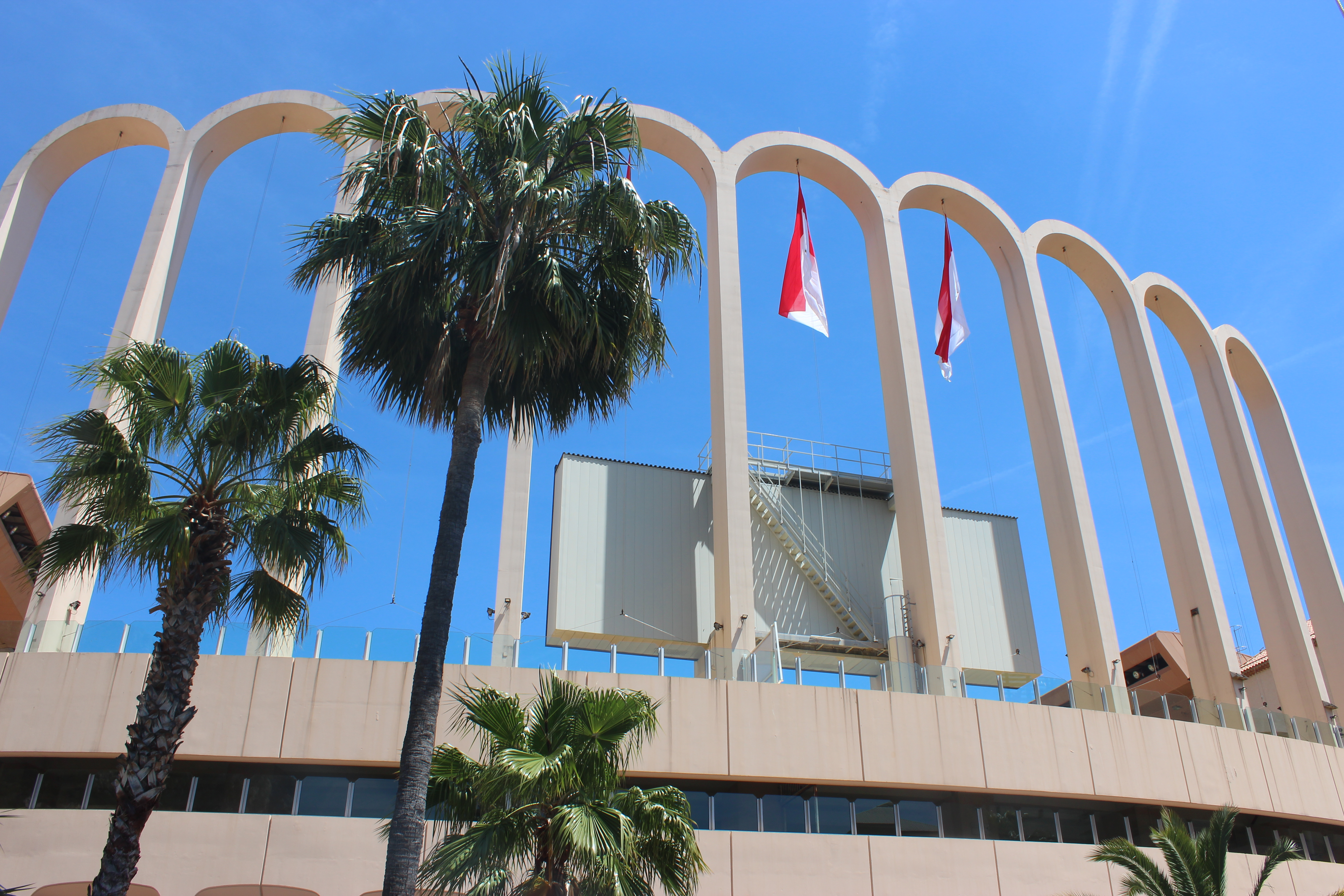
Arches of Stade Louis II

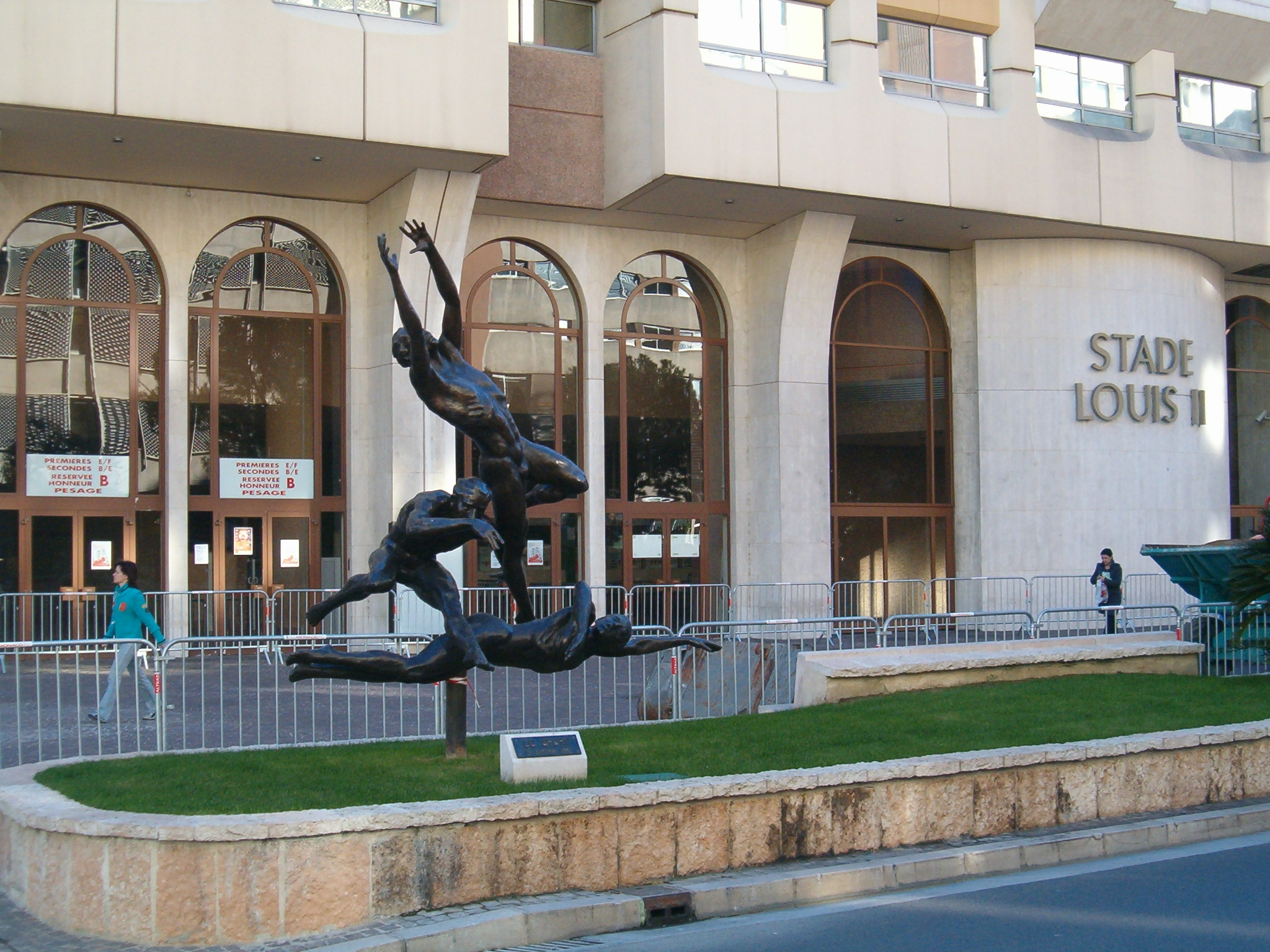
Stadium exterior

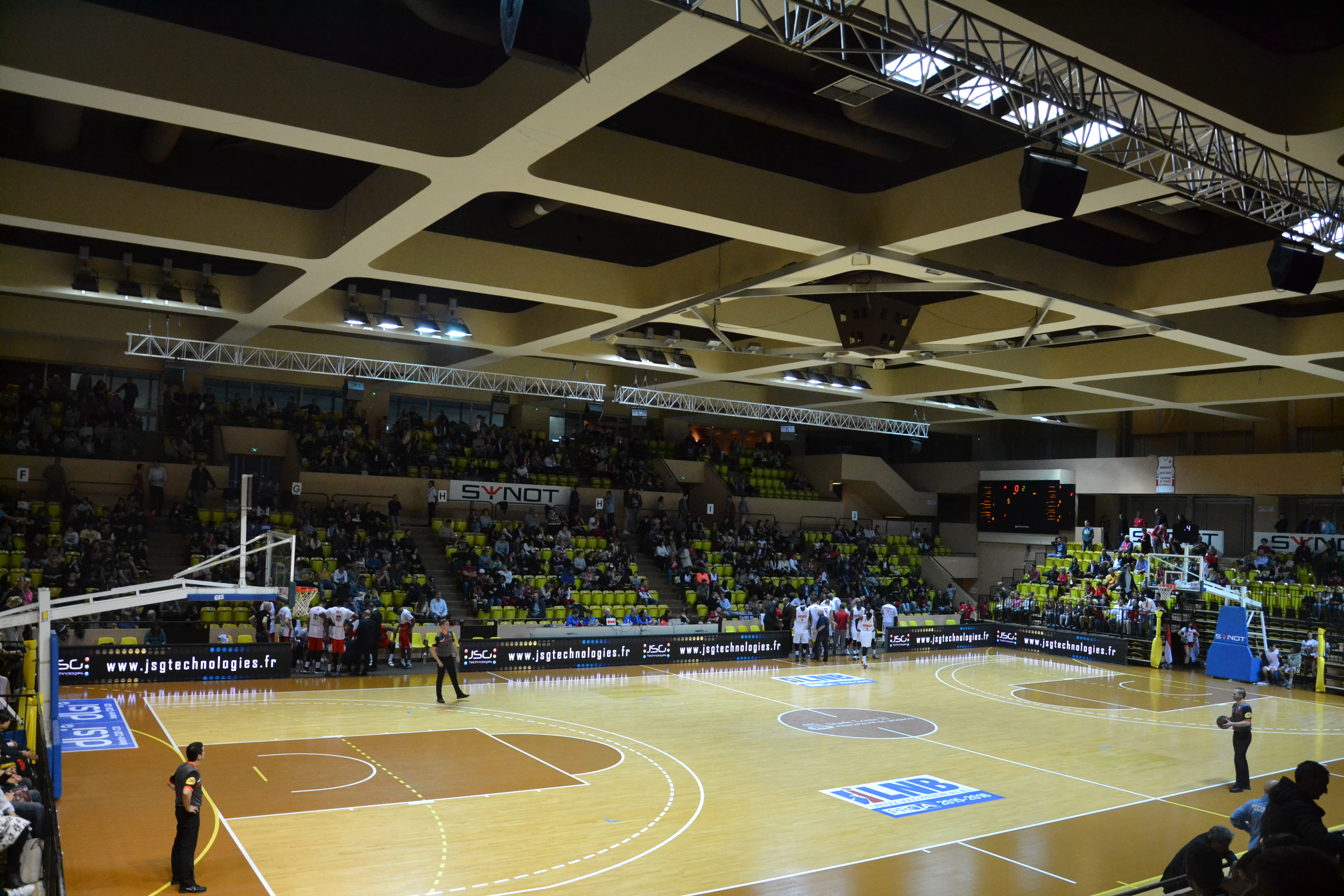
The Salle Gaston Médecin indoor arena, which is used by the AS Monaco basketball club

== National team matches ==
Only rarely have national teams played at the stadium:

5 February 1988 1988 Tournoi de France bronze final	Switzerland	2–1	Austria	Monaco
	Koller 25'; Sutter 65'		Geiger 48' (o.g.)	Stadium: Stade Louis II; Attendance: 3,000; Referee: Michel Girard (France)

5 February 1988 1988 Tournoi de France final	France	2–1	Morocco	Monaco
	Lamriss 9' (o.g.); Stopyra 49'	Match Report	Lamriss 34'	Stadium: Stade Louis II; Attendance: 10,000; Referee: Michel Vautrot (France)

11 February 1997 1998 WCQ	Estonia	0–0	Scotland	Monaco
20:00 UTC+1				Stadium: Stade Louis II; Attendance: 3,766; Referee: Saïd Ennjimi (France)

3 March 2010 International friendly	Italy	0–0	Cameroon	Monaco
20:45 UTC+1		(Report)		Stadium: Stade Louis II; Attendance: 10,752; Referee: Saïd Ennjimi (France)

5 June 2016 International friendly	Russia	1–1	Serbia	Monaco
18:00 UTC+2	Dzyuba 85'		Mitrović 88'	Stadium: Stade Louis II; Attendance: 2,000

== See also ==
- Geography of Monaco
- Lists of stadiums

Preceded by Two-legged matches	UEFA Super Cup; Match venue 1998–2012	Succeeded by Eden Arena; Prague
