= Jürgen Werner (footballer, born 1961) =

Austrian footballer

Personal information
- Date of birth: 3 December 1961 (age 64)
- Place of birth: Wels, Austria
- Height: 1.79 m (5 ft 10 1/2 in)
- Position: Midfielder

Senior career*
| Years | Team | Apps | (Gls) |
| 1979–1980 | Eintracht Wels | | |
| 1980–1988 | VÖEST Linz | 192 | (30) |
| 1988–1989 | Sturm Graz | 18 | (3) |
| 1989–1991 | VÖEST Linz | | |
| 1991–1992 | FC Stahl Linz | 31 | (2) |
| 1992–1998 | Eintracht Wels | | |
| 1998–1999 | Union Weißkirchen | | |
| 1999–2000 | Neuhofen/Krems | | |
| 2000–2001 | Union Wels | | |
| 2001–2003 | Neuhofen/Krems | | |
| 2003–2004 | ASKÖ Schwertberg | | |

International career
| 1986–1988 | Austria | 11 | (0) |

Managerial career
- 1993: FC Stahl Linz
- 1996: FC Linz (caretaker)
- * Club domestic league appearances and goals

Jürgen Werner (born 3 December 1961) is a retired Austrian football midfielder who played for Austria. Currently Werner is on the board of Austria Wien, responsible for sport.
