= Marcus Pürk =

Austrian footballer

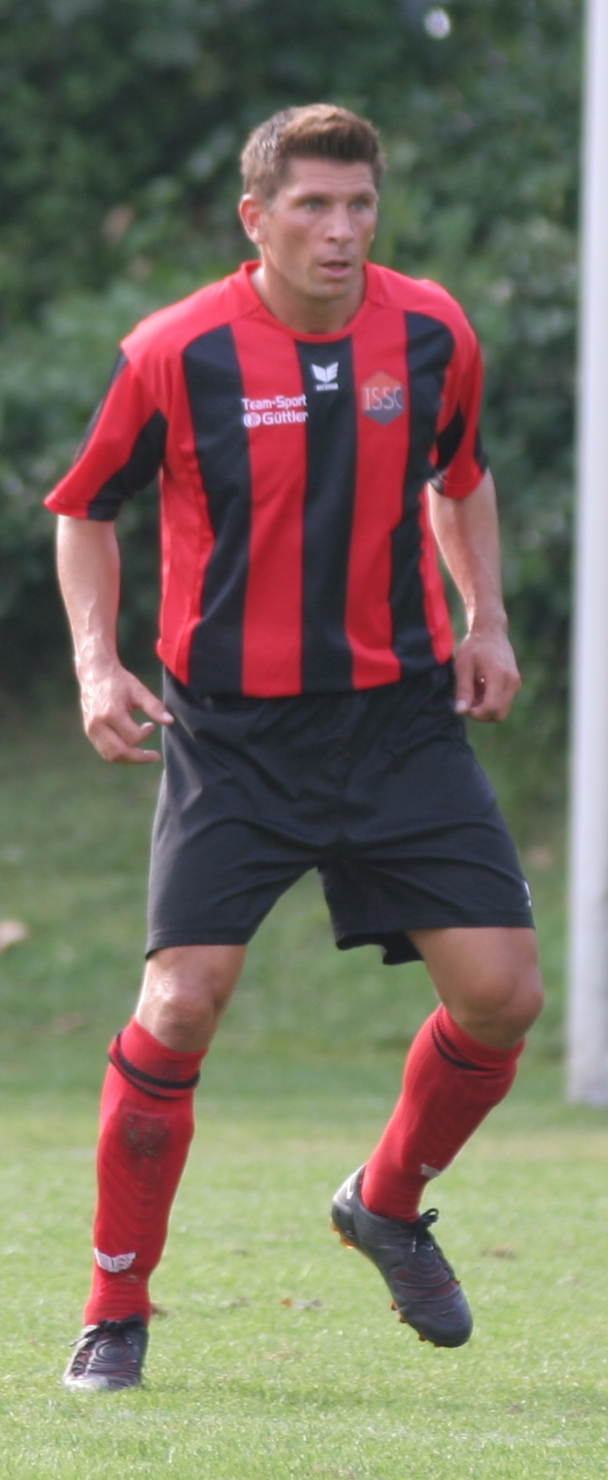
- Marcus Pürk

Personal information
- Date of birth: 21 September 1974 (age 52)
- Place of birth: Vienna, Austria
- Height: 1.78 m (5 ft 10 in)
- Positions: Midfielder; left winger

Senior career*
Years	Team	Apps	(Gls)
1992–1994	Austria Wien	29	(2)
1994–1995	Rapid Wien	34	(13)
1995–1996	Real Sociedad	30	(5)
1996–1997	Sturm Graz	30	(5)
1997–1999	Rapid Wien	70	(14)
1999–2004	1860 Munich	50	(0)
2004–2005	Admira Wacker Mödling	1	(0)
2005–2007	First Vienna	54	(22)
2007	ASK Schwadorf	5	(0)
2008	Admira Wacker Mödling	2	(0)
2008–2009	SV Stockerau	25	(7)
2009	1. Simmeringer SC	8	(2)
2010–2014	SV St. Margarethen	15	(5)

International career
1995–2002	Austria	2	(1)
- * Club domestic league appearances and goals

Marcus Pürk (born 21 September 1974) is an Austrian former professional footballer who played as a midfielder.

== Club career ==
Born in Vienna, Pürk made his professional league debut for Austria Wien in the 1992–93 season but he moved to city rivals Rapid Wien for a very successful 1994–95 season in which he was the country's highest native goalscorer (with Mario Haas and Thomas Janeschitz), he won his first cap and he was chosen Footballer of the Year by his fellow players. It earned him a move to Spanish outfit Real Sociedad only to return to Austria and join Sturm Graz a year later. He also had one season at Sturm, then rejoined Rapid for another two and sealed a second move abroad when he signed for German Bundesliga side TSV 1860 Munich. He returned to Austria in 2004 but only played one match for Admira Wacker Mödling and then went on to play at lower league sides.

== International career ==
Pürk made his debut for the Austria national team in April 1995. He replaced Herfried Sabitzer in the 69th minute of the UEFA Euro 1996 qualifier against Liechtenstein before scoring in the 84th minute of the 7−0 victory at Stadion Lehen in Salzburg. He earned a second cap in August 2002 when he featured in the friendly against Switzerland at St. Jakob-Park in Basel.

=== International goal ===
Scores and results list Austria's goal tally first.

No	Date	Venue	Opponent	Score	Result	Competition
1.	26 April 1995	Stadion Lehen, Salzburg, Austria	Liechtenstein	5–0	7–0	Euro 1996 qualifier

== Career statistics ==
Appearances and goals by national team and year
National team	Year	Apps	Goals
Austria	1995	1	1
Austria	1996	0	0
Austria	1997	0	0
Austria	1998	0	0
Austria	1999	0	0
Austria	2000	0	0
Austria	2001	0	0
Austria	2002	1	0
Total		2	1

== Honours ==
Rapid Wien

- Austrian Cup: 1994–95

Sturm Graz

- Austrian Cup: 1996–97
