= Patrik Hefti =

Liechtenstein footballer

Personal information
- Full name: Patrik Hefti
- Date of birth: 19 November 1969 (age 56)
- Place of birth: Liechtenstein
- Position: Defender

Senior career*
| Years | Team | Apps | (Gls) |
| 1989–2000 | FC Vaduz | | |
| 1994–1995 | Carolina Dynamo | 24 | (12) |
| 2000–2002 | FC Schaan | | |

International career
| 1990–2002 | Liechtenstein | 33 | (0) |
- * Club domestic league appearances and goals

Patrik Hefti (born 19 November 1969) is a Liechtensteiner former association football defender who played professionally domestically and in the United States. He also earned 33 caps for the Liechtenstein national football team. He is the Head of Trading Business Management with LGT Bank in Singapore. He also used to play amateur football with Swiss FC.

In 1989, Hefti began his professional career with FC Vaduz. In 1994 and 1995, he played for the Carolina Dynamo in the USISL. In 2000, he moved to FC Schaan where he finished his career in 2002.

By the time he retired from playing, Hefti had already begun his career in financial services. In 1998, he joined LGT Bank and served as an apprentice with Berufbildungszentrum Buchs in Switzerland from 1998 to 2001. In 2004, he earned a degree in business administration from the Kaderschule St. Gallen and a master's degree in applied finance from Macquarie University in 2007.
