= Walter Hochmaier =

Austrian footballer

Personal information
- Date of birth: 28 September 1968 (age 58)
- Place of birth: Eisenkappel, Austria
- Height: 1.78 m (5 ft 10 in)
- Position: Defender

Senior career*
Years	Team	Apps	(Gls)
–1990	Wolfsberger AC		
1990–1993	Wiener Sport-Club		
1993–1997	LASK		
1997–1998	?		
1998–1999	FCN St. Pölten		
1999–2002	VfB Admira Wacker Mödling		
2002	LASK		

International career
1994	Austria	3	(1)
- * Club domestic league appearances and goals

Walter Hochmaier (born 28 September 1968) is an Austrian former professional footballer who played as a defender. He made three appearances for the Austria national team in 1994.
