= 1997 Tournoi de France =

Football competition

Warm-up for 1998 FIFA World Cup

Tournament details
- Host country: France
- Dates: 3–11 June
- Teams: 4
- Venues: 4 (in 4 host cities)

Final positions
- Champions: England
- Runners-up: Brazil
- Third place: France
- Fourth place: Italy

Tournament statistics
- Matches played: 6
- Goals scored: 16 (2.67 per match)
- Top scorer(s): (Italy) Alessandro Del Piero (3 goals)

The 1997 Tournoi de France ([tuʁnwa də fʁɑ̃s]; French, 'Tournament of France'), often referred to as Le Tournoi, was an international football tournament held in France in early June 1997 as a warm-up to the 1998 FIFA World Cup. The four national teams participating at the tournament were Brazil, England, hosts France, and Italy. They played against each other in a single round-robin tournament with the group winner also being the winner of the tournament. It was the second Tournoi de France tournament after 1988.

== Event ==
England won the tournament after collecting six points by winning their first two matches, against Italy and France, and losing one to Brazil. Brazil were second with five points, a product of a win and two draws. Their 3–3 draw with Italy included two goals from then 22-year-old Alessandro Del Piero and one goal apiece from Romário and Ronaldo as well as one own goal from each of the teams. Del Piero was the top goalscorer of the tournament with three goals scored while Romário scored twice.

In the 21st minute of the opening match between France and Brazil, Roberto Carlos scored his famous Banana Shot free kick goal, curling from a 33.13-metre distance and often considered to be one of the best in the modern game.

=== Elo Ratings before the tournament ===
Elo Ratings before Le Tournoi
Team	Elo Ranking (2 June 1997)
Brazil	2 (2039)
France	3 (2008)
Italy	5 (1964)
England	7 (1932)

== Venues ==
Nantes	Montpellier	Paris	Lyon
Stade de la Beaujoire	Stade de la Mosson	Parc des Princes	Stade de Gerland
47°15′20.27″N 1°31′31.35″W	43°37′19.85″N 3°48′43.28″E	48°50′29″N 2°15′11″E	45°43′26″N 4°49′56″E
Capacity: 39,500	Capacity: 32,900	Capacity: 48,875	Capacity: 34,000
1997 Tournoi de France (France)

== Table ==
Team	Pld	W	D	L	GF	GA	GD	Pts
England	3	2	0	1	3	1	+2	6
Brazil	3	1	2	0	5	4	+1	5
France	3	0	2	1	3	4	−1	2
Italy	3	0	2	1	5	7	−2	2

== Results ==
3 June 1997
21:40

France	1–1	Brazil
Keller 55'	Report	Roberto Carlos 21'

Stade de Gerland, Lyon
Attendance: 28,193
Referee: Kim Milton Nielsen (Denmark)

4 June 1997
21:10

England	2–0	Italy
Wright 26'; Scholes 43'	Report

Stade de la Beaujoire, Nantes
Attendance: 25,000
Referee: Günter Benkö (Austria)

7 June 1997
22:10

France	0–1	England
	Report	Shearer 86'

Stade de la Mosson, Montpellier
Attendance: 23,000
Referee: Said Belqola (Morocco)

8 June 1997
21:10

Italy	3–3	Brazil
Del Piero 6', 61' (pen.); Aldair 23' (o.g.)	Report	Lombardo 35' (o.g.); Ronaldo 70'; Romário 84'

Stade de Gerland, Lyon
Attendance: 30,000
Referee: Serge Muhmenthaler (Switzerland)

10 June 1997

England	0–1	Brazil
	Report	Romário 61'

Parc des Princes, Paris
Attendance: 40,000
Referee: John Toro Rendón (Colombia)

11 June 1997

France	2–2	Italy
Zidane 12'; Djorkaeff 73'	Report	Casiraghi 61'; Del Piero 89' (pen.)

Parc des Princes, Paris
Attendance: 35,000
Referee: Antonio Jesús López Nieto (Spain)

1997 Tournoi de France

England
First title

== Statistics ==
=== Goalscorers ===
There were 16 goals scored in 6 matches, for an average of 2.67 goals per match.

3 goals

- (Italy) Alessandro Del Piero

2 goals

- (Brazil) Romário

1 goal

- (Brazil) Roberto Carlos
- (Brazil) Ronaldo
- (England) Alan Shearer
- (England) Ian Wright
- (England) Paul Scholes
- (France) Marc Keller
- (France) Youri Djorkaeff
- (France) Zinedine Zidane
- (Italy) Pierluigi Casiraghi

1 own goal

- (Brazil) Aldair (playing against Italy)
- (Italy) Attilio Lombardo (playing against Brazil)

== Broadcasters ==
- (Italy) Rai 1
- (Spain) FORTA
- (Sweden) SVT
- (United States) Fox Sports (English), Telemundo (Spanish)
- (Brazil) Globo
- (Indonesia) ANTV
- (United Kingdom) Sky Sports

== See also ==
- 1998 FIFA World Cup
