= Günther Golautschnig =

Austrian footballer

Personal information
- Date of birth: 22 November 1953 (age 72)

International career
Years	Team	Apps	(Gls)
1982	Austria	1	(0)

Günther Golautschnig (born 22 November 1953) is an Austrian footballer. He played in one match for the Austria national football team in 1982.
