= Hannes Reinmayr =

Austrian footballer

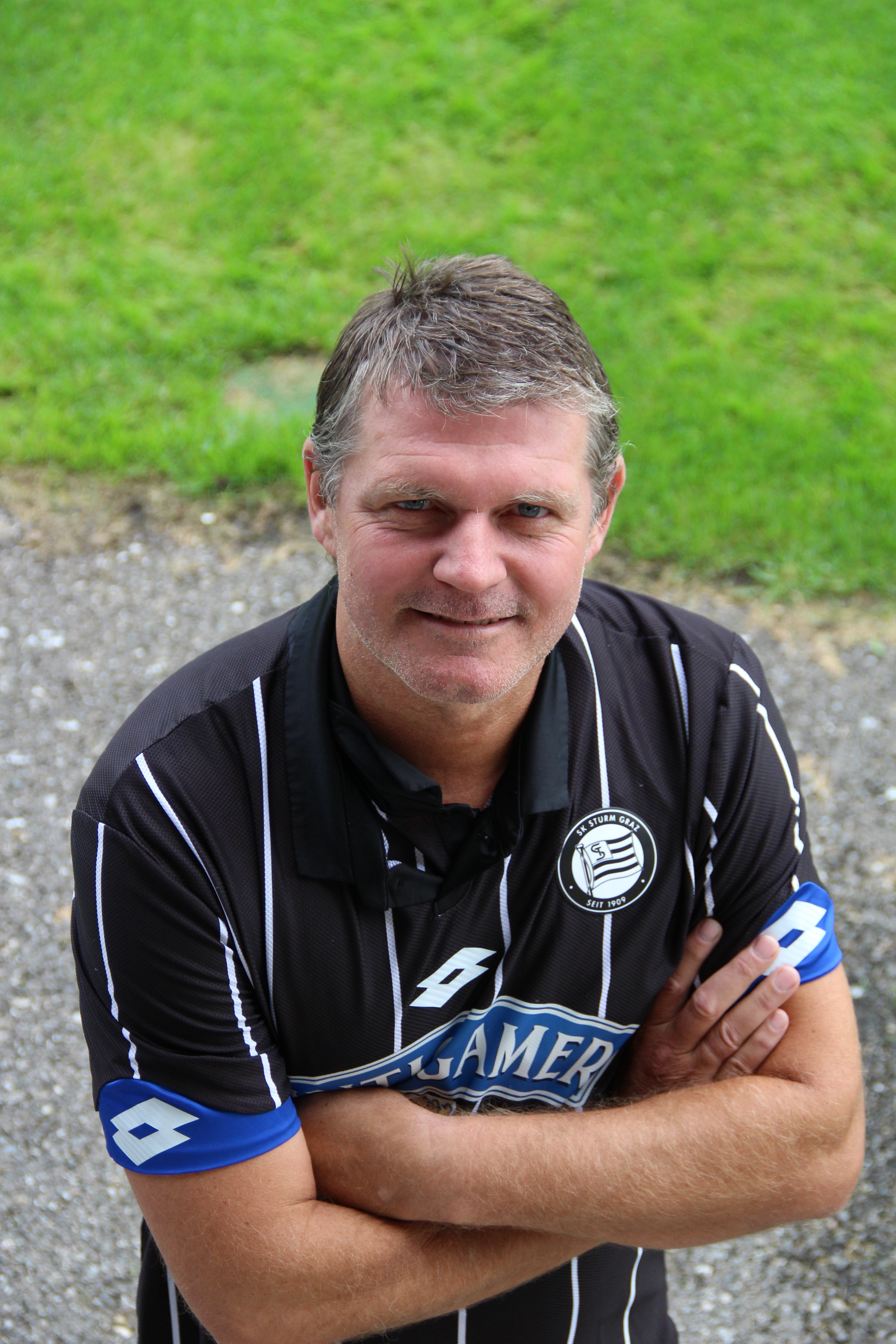
- Reinmayr in 2018

Personal information
- Full name: Hannes Reinmayr
- Date of birth: 23 August 1969 (age 57)
- Place of birth: Vienna, Austria
- Height: 1.80 m (5 ft 11 in)
- Position: Striker

Youth career
- SC Kaiserebersdorf

Senior career*
Years	Team	Apps	(Gls)
1987–1989	Austria Wien	2	(0)
1988	→ FC Salzburg (loan)	21	(3)
1989–1990	Wiener Sportclub	6	(0)
1990	First Vienna	34	(5)
1991–1992	Stahl Linz	32	(4)
1992–1994	MSV Duisburg	43	(5)
1994–1995	Bayer Uerdingen	15	(0)
1995–2001	Sturm Graz	191	(42)
2002	1. FC Saarbrücken	14	(1)
2002–2003	SV Mattersburg	25	(1)
2003–2006	SK St.Andrä		
2007–2009	SC Stainz	5	(4)
2009	ATUS Velden	6	(3)
Total		341	(57)

International career
1993–1999	Austria	14	(4)
- * Club domestic league appearances and goals

Hannes Reinmayr (born 23 August 1969) is an Austrian former footballer who works as manager of SV Gössendorf.

== Club career ==
Born in Vienna, Reinmayr started his professional career at Austria Wien but did not managed to get playing time and moved to First Vienna in 1990. After a season at Stahl Linz he moved abroad to play for German clubs MSV Duisburg and Bayer Uerdingen before enjoying considerable successes in six years at Sturm Graz, winning two league titles and three domestic cups as well as playing two years in the UEFA Champions League group stages. He then played another half season in Germany before ending his pro career at SV Mattersburg.

He then became player and co-trainer at SK St. Andrä.

== International career ==
He made his debut for Austria in an October 1993 World Cup qualification match against Israel and was a participant at the 1998 FIFA World Cup. He earned 14 caps, scoring four goals. His last international was the embarrassing 0–9 defeat by Spain in a European Championship qualification match in March 1999.

== Honours ==
- Austrian Football Bundesliga: 1997–98, 1998–99
- Austrian Cup: 1995–96, 1996–97, 1998–99
