= Gerald Piesinger =

Austrian footballer

Personal information
- Full name: Gerald Piesinger
- Date of birth: 16 August 1959 (age 67)
- Place of birth: Austria
- Position: Defender

Senior career*
Years	Team	Apps	(Gls)
1980–1989	LASK Linz	192	(9)
1989–1991	SK Vorwärts Steyr	26	(0)

International career^{‡}
1986–1987	Austria	7	(0)
- * Club domestic league appearances and goals as of 3 November 2009 ‡ National team caps and goals as of 3 November 2009

Gerald Piesinger (born 16 August 1959) is a retired football defender from Austria. During his club career, Piesinger played for LASK Linz and SK Vorwärts Steyr.

== Personal life ==
Piesinger's son Simon Piesinger is also a professional footballer.
