= Walter Waldhör =

Austrian footballer

Personal information
- Date of birth: 21 September 1968 (age 58)
- Position: Striker

Team information
- Current team: Union Pettenbach

Senior career*
Years	Team	Apps	(Gls)
?–1987	Union Pettenbach		
1987–1994	SK Vorwärts Steyr		
1994	FC Linz		
1995–1997	SV Ried		
1997–present	Union Pettenbach		

International career^{‡}
1992	Austria	2	(1)
- * Club domestic league appearances and goals as of 15:49, 14 December 2008 (UTC) ‡ National team caps and goals as of 15:49, 14 December 2008 (UTC)

Walter Waldhör (born 21 September 1968) is a former Austrian international footballer, currently manager of Union Pettenbach.
