= Rıdvan Dilmen =

Turkish football player and manager (born 1962)

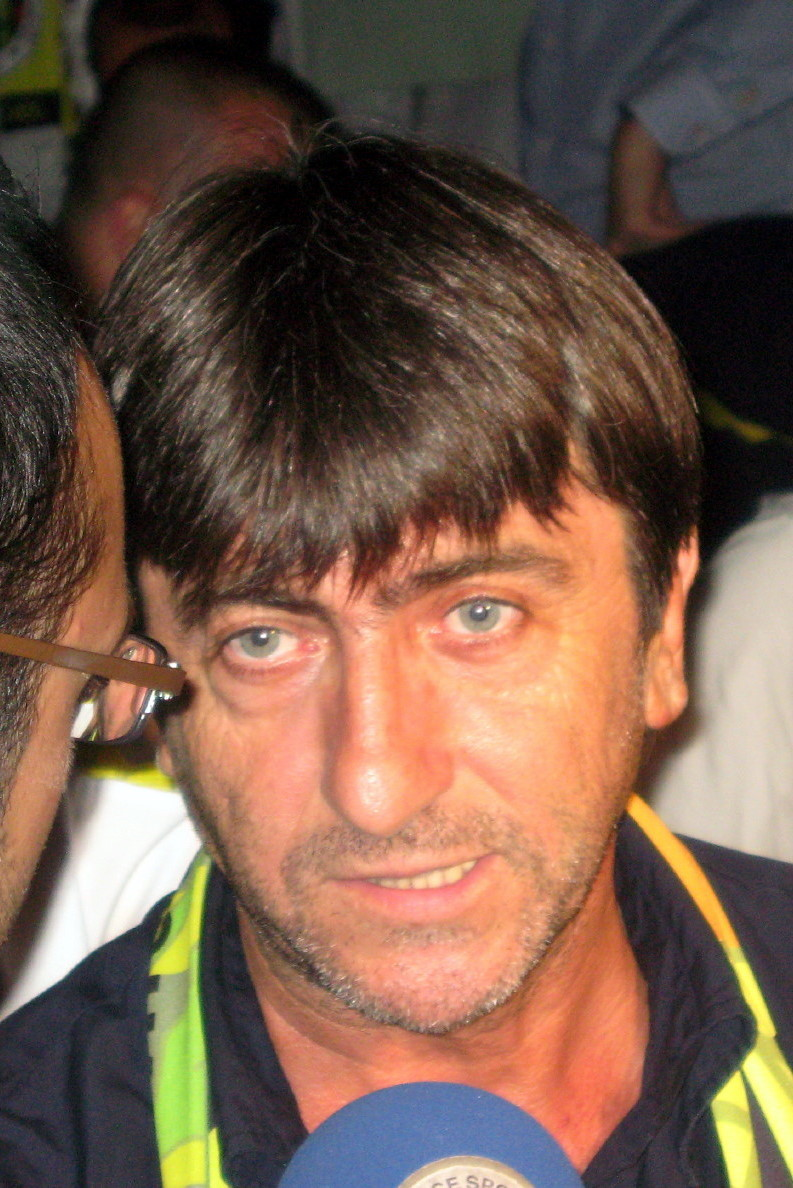

Personal information
- Date of birth: 15 August 1962 (age 64)
- Place of birth: Nazilli, Turkey
- Positions: Attacking midfielder; winger

Senior career*
Years	Team	Apps	(Gls)
1977–1979	Nazilli Sümerspor		
1979–1980	Muğlaspor	10	(3)
1980–1983	Boluspor	41	(8)
1983–1987	Sarıyer	119	(29)
1987–1994	Fenerbahçe	108	(32)
Total		278	(72)

International career
1984–1992	Turkey	25	(5)

Managerial career
- 1998–1999: Vanspor
- 1999–2000: Fenerbahçe
- 2000: Konyaspor
- 2001: Altay
- 2001–2002: Adanaspor
- 2002–2003: Karşıyaka
- * Club domestic league appearances and goals

Rıdvan Dilmen (born 15 August 1962) is a Turkish former professional footballer who played as an attacking midfielder or winger, notably for Fenerbahçe and the Turkey national team. During his career, Dilmen established himself as one of the most skilled players of the Süper Lig.

Although he stated on numerous occasions his dislike for it, he was given the nickname "Şeytan Rıdvan" ("Rıdvan the Devil") mostly for his wits, immense speed with the ball and stupendous fakes. Since retiring as a player, Rıdvan coached several teams before becoming a color commentator, analyst and sportswriter.

== Playing career ==
Dilmen made his debut with Sümerspor in 1977. He transferred to Muğlaspor in exchange for 25 footballs in 1979 and then became a renowned player for Boluspor between 1980–1983. After playing for Sarıyer between 1983–1987, he signed for Fenerbahçe and fulfilled his dream.

He was the main actor of the 1988–89 Turkish League season, which Fenerbahçe won the title with 103 goals in 36 matches. In the 1988–1989 season, he scored 19 goals and made 41 assists. After getting injured in 1990 against Trabzonspor by the Serbian defender Miodrag Ješić, he never fully recovered. Rıdvan failed to fulfill expectations due to consistent injuries, which required sixteen operations. He retired in 1994 after painful years of injuries. He is one of the symbol players not only for Fenerbahçe but for Turkish football also. The reason that his name is not as well-known worldwide are that he seldom had the chance to prove himself on the big international occasions. He played with Turkey, mostly in the 80s, and was a no-hoper and Fenerbahçe's status on the European club stage was scarcely different.

Dilmen made 25 appearances for the Turkey national team from 1984 to 1992.

== Managerial career ==
Dilmen worked as a manager for Vanspor in 1998–99 season. His club finished the season as champions of Turkish Second League. He then became Fenerbahçe football teams manager in 2000. However, his stay only lasted five weeks. He resigned as Fenerbahçe was eliminated from UEFA Cup at an early stage. Dilmen was also employed as a manager for Altay SK and Adanaspor and Karşıyaka SK. So far, he doesn't have a successful managing career as he was expected to deliver.

== Commentating career ==
Dilmen is a commentator at NTV Spor and a columnist at Sabah; at the same time he does bet guesswork at Fanatik newspaper. He is a narrator at Star TV for the important Champions League matches. Dilmen has a reputation of saying "it'll be a goal" a few moments before the ball hits the back of the net. He transferred to Sabah on 1 August 2010.
