= Harald Schneider (footballer) =

Austrian footballer

Personal information
- Date of birth: 8 June 1966 (age 60)
- Height: 1.89 m (6 ft 2 in)
- Position: Defender

Senior career*
Years	Team	Apps	(Gls)
1988–1989	LASK Linz		
1990–1992	FK Austria Wien		
1992–1994	FC Tirol Innsbruck		
1994–?	SV Wörgl		

International career
1991	Austria	1	(0)
- * Club domestic league appearances and goals

Harald Schneider (born 8 June 1966) is a retired Austrian football defender.
