= Manfred Zsak =

Austrian footballer

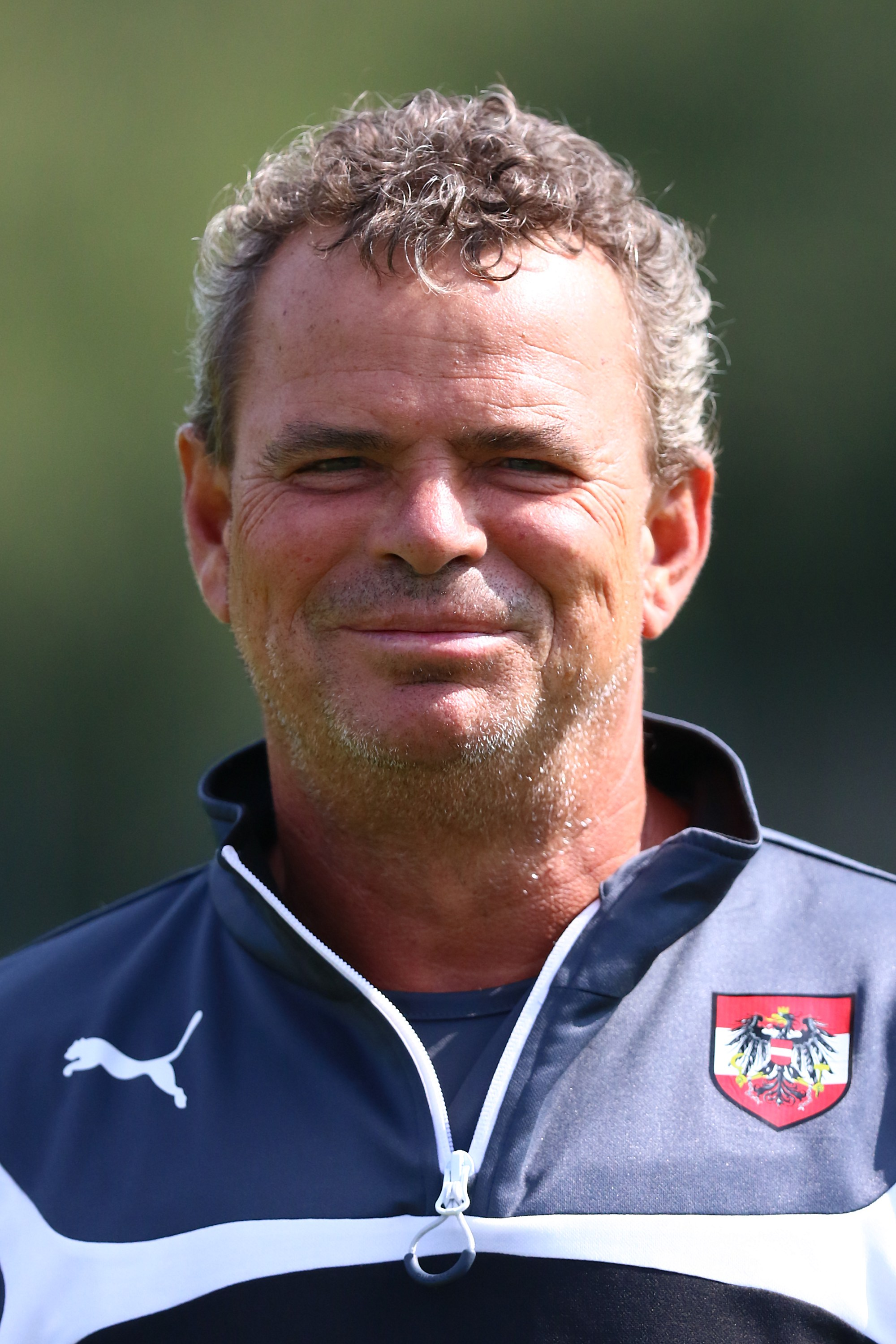
- Zsak in 2018

Personal information
- Date of birth: 22 December 1964 (age 61)
- Place of birth: Mödling, Austria
- Positions: Midfielder; defender

Senior career*
Years	Team	Apps	(Gls)
1982–1987	Admira Wacker	129	(?)
1987–1996	Austria Wien	250	(50)
1996	GAK	3	(1)
1996–1997	FC Linz	26	(2)
1997–1998	VfB Admira Wacker Mödling	17	(4)
1998–1999	SV Schwechat		
2000–2001	ASK Bad Vöslau		
2001–2004	SV Rust		

International career
1986–1993	Austria	49	(5)

Managerial career
- FK Austria Wien
- Admira Wacker Mödling Akademie
- Polizei/Feuerwehr
- SV Rust
- 2005–2006: Austria U16
- 2006–2009: Austria U21
- 2009–2011: Austria (Assistant Coach)
- * Club domestic league appearances and goals

Manfred Zsak (born 22 December 1964) is an Austrian football coach and former professional player.

== Club career ==
Zsak started his professional career at Admira Wacker and moved to Austria Wien aged 23 and stayed with them for almost 10 years, captaining the side for most of his period at Austria. In 1996, he moved to GAK but left them after only a month and three matches to join FC Linz. He returned to his now renamed first team VfB Admira Wacker Mödling and suffered relegation with them to the second division in 1998.

He finished his career playing for lower league outfits SV Schwechat, ASK Bad Vöslau and SV Rust.

== International career ==
He made his debut for Austria in an October 1986 3-0 win over Albania and was a participant at the 1990 FIFA World Cup. He earned 49 caps, scoring 5 goals. He ended his international career at a May 1993 World Cup qualification match against Finland.

== Coaching career ==
Zsak was the head coach of the Austrian under-21 side, and then was named as Assistant Coach for the Austrian senior team.

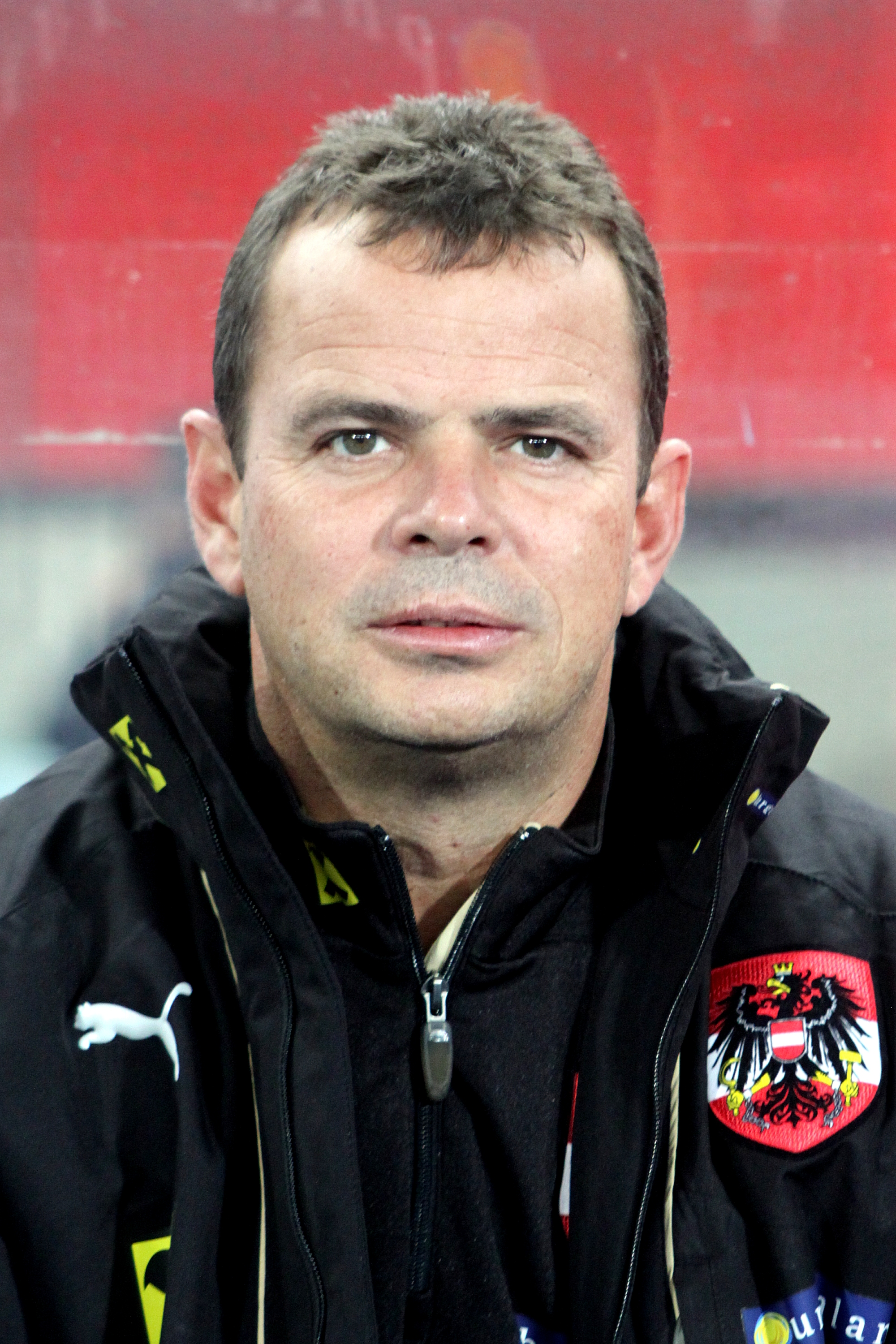

== Honours ==
- Austrian Football Bundesliga (3):
  - 1991, 1992, 1993
- Austrian Cup (3):
  - 1990, 1992, 1994
