= Ernst Ogris =

Austrian footballer (1967–2017)

Personal information
- Date of birth: 9 December 1967
- Place of birth: Vienna, Austria
- Date of death: 29 March 2017 (aged 49)
- Place of death: Vienna, Austria
- Height: 1.72 m (5 ft 8 in)
- Position: Striker

Senior career*
| Years | Team | Apps | (Gls) |
| 1987–1988 | Austria Wien | 12 | (1) |
| 1988–1990 | St. Pölten | 76 | (23) |
| 1990–1993 | Admira/Wacker | 68 | (21) |
| 1993–1994 | Hertha BSC | 29 | (7) |
| 1995 | FC Admira/Wacker | 10 | (1) |
| 1997–1999 | SV Schwechat | ≈29 | (4) |
| 2000–2001 | SPC Helfort | 42 | (33) |
| 2001 | SC Zwettl | 14 | (1) |
| 2001–2002 | SPC Helfort | | |
| 2003–2005 | PSV Team für Wien | ≈25 | (17) |
| 2005–2007 | SV Stripfing | | |
| 2008 | DSG Inter Leopoldau | | |
| 2008–2009 | KSC/FCB Donaustadt | | |

International career
| 1991 | Austria | 1 | (1) |
- * Club domestic league appearances and goals

Ernst Ogris (9 December 1967 – 29 March 2017) was an Austrian footballer who played as a striker.

== Club career ==
Ogris started his career at Austria Wien, but left them for St. Pölten in 1988. A crowd favorite there, Ernstl scored 18 goals in 64 games for them then joined Admira/Wacker with whom he lost the 1992 Austrian Cup Final. He had his most successful period with Admira and had a season in the 2. Bundesliga with Hertha BSC.

After another short stint at Admira, Ogris played at several lower league sides.

== International career ==
Ogris made his debut for Austria in a June 1991 European Championship qualifier against Denmark in which he immediately scored a goal. It proved to be his sole international match.

== Personal life and death ==
He was the younger brother of Andreas Ogris.

In March 2017 Ogris was struck by a viral infection which affected his kidney, liver, heart and brain. He was artificially put in a coma KFJ-Krankenhaus and died there on 29 March.
