= Andreas Ogris =

Austrian footballer (born 1964)

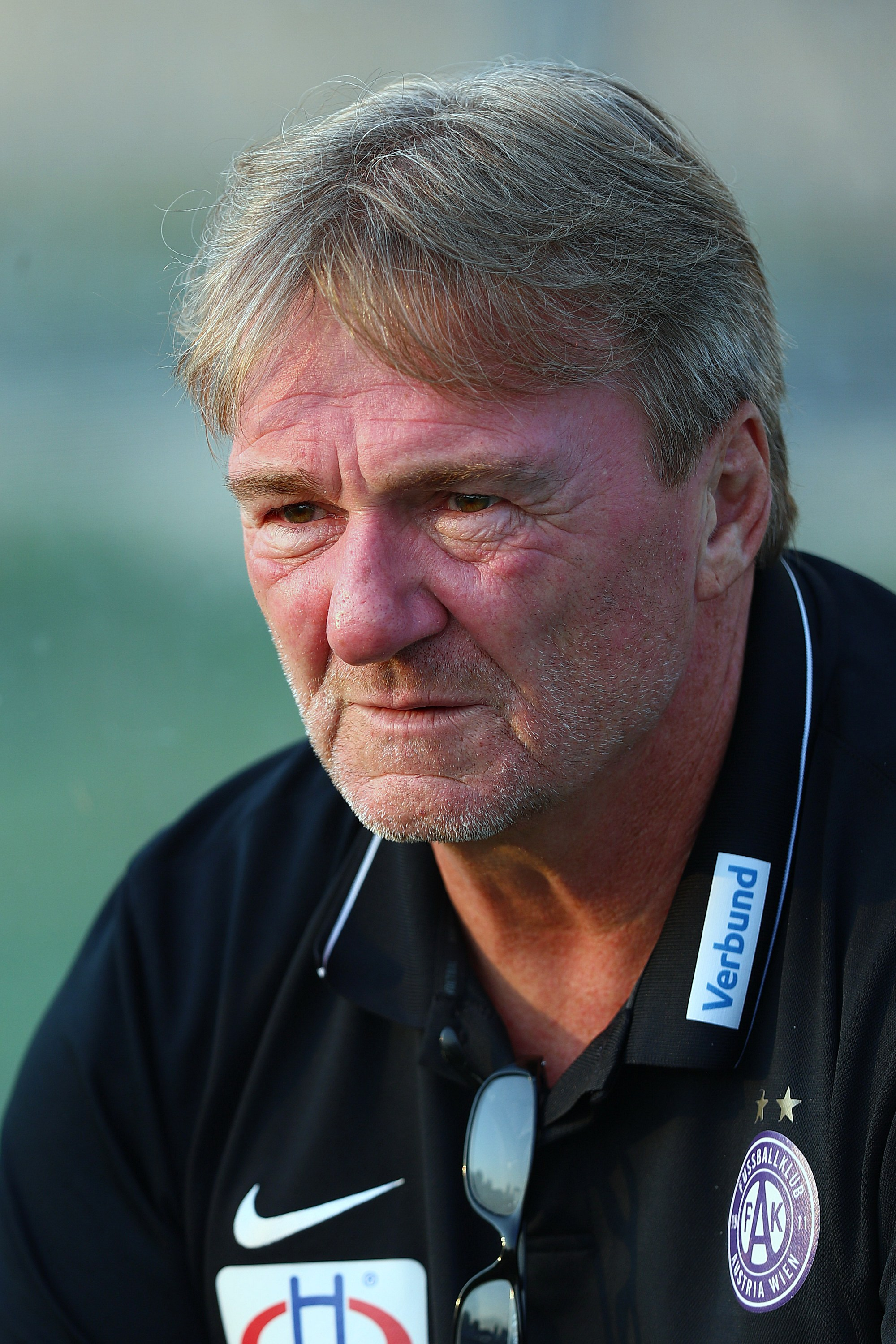
- Ogris in 2018

Personal information
- Date of birth: 7 October 1964 (age 62)
- Place of birth: Vienna, Austria
- Height: 1.78 m (5 ft 10 in)
- Position: Striker

Youth career
- Floridsdorfer AC
- 1972–1982: Favoritner AC
- 1983: Austria Wien

Senior career*
Years	Team	Apps	(Gls)
1983–1990	Austria Wien	82	(36)
1990–1991	Espanyol	29	(4)
1991–1992	Austria Wien	26	(12)
1992	→ LASK (loan)	15	(3)
1992–1997	Austria Wien	109	(31)
1997–1998	Admira/Wacker	13	(2)
Total		274	(88)

International career
1986–1997	Austria	63	(11)

Managerial career
- 2001–2002: 1. Simmeringer SC
- 2002–2004: Polizei/Feuerwehr
- 2004–2005: ASK Schwadorf
- 2005–2006: 1. Simmeringer SC
- 2008–2010: Floridsdorfer AC
- 2014–2015: Austria Wien B
- 2015: Austria Wien
- 2015–2016: Austria Wien (assistant)
- 2015–2019: Austria Wien B
- * Club domestic league appearances and goals

Andreas Ogris (born 7 October 1964) is an Austrian football manager and former player. He is the older brother of former Austrian international and Hertha BSC player Ernst Ogris.

== Playing career ==
Born in Vienna, Ogris played for Austria Wien from 1983 until 1997, playing 276 matches and scoring 99 goals. His career was split with Spanish club Espanyol and LASK. He ended professional career at Admira/Wacker before moving into coaching.

Ogris earned 63 caps and scored 11 goals for Austria national team. In 1983, he played at the FIFA World Youth Championship. He made his senior debut for Austria on 15 October 1986 against Albania and participated at the 1990 FIFA World Cup. In April 1997, Ogris played his last international match in a 1998 FIFA World Cup qualification against Scotland, in which he came on as a late substitute for Franz Aigner.

== Coaching career ==
On 21 February 2014, Ogris was appointed head coach of the reserve team Austria Wien until the end of the season. However, Herbert Gager was sacked as the head coach of the first-team and didn't accept any other position within the club. Therefore, Ogris took over for Gager on a permanent basis on 2 June.

On 22 March 2015, Ogris became head coach of the first team for the remainder of the season after Gerald Baumgartner was sacked. His first match as interim head coach was a 3–1 loss to Red Bull Salzburg. Thorsten Fink became head coach on 4 June 2015 and Ogris became his assistant. His final match as interim head coach was a 2–0 loss to Red Bull Salzburg on 3 June 2015. The same year in June, Ogris returned to the reserve team of Austria Wien.

== Style of play ==
Coach Josef Hickersberger described Ogris as an instinctive footballer with exceptional combat machine.

== Career statistics ==
=== International ===
Appearances and goals by national team and year
National team	Year	Apps	Goals
Austria	1986	2	1
Austria	1987	7	2
Austria	1988	7	1
Austria	1989	9	1
Austria	1990	11	4
Austria	1991	5	0
Austria	1992	8	2
Austria	1993	7	0
Austria	1994	2	0
Austria	1995	3	1
Austria	1996	3	1
Austria	1997	1	0
Total		65	13

Scores and results list Austria's goal tally first, score column indicates score after each Ogris goal.

List of international goals scored by Andreas Ogris
No.	Date	Venue	Opponent	Score	Result	Competition	Ref.
1	15 October 1986	Liebenauer Stadium, Graz, Austria	Albania	1–0	3–0	UEFA Euro 1988 qualifying	
2	7 February 1987	Chedly Zouiten Stadium, Tunis, Tunisia	Tunisia	2–1	3–1	Friendly	
3	18 August 1987	Espenmoos, St. Gallen, Switzerland	Switzerland	1–0	2–2	Friendly	
4	2 February 1988	Stadium de Toulouse, Toulouse, France	Morocco	1–0	1–3	Friendly	
5	31 May 1989	Ullevaal Stadion, Oslo, Norway	Norway	1–4	1–4	Friendly	
6	11 April 1990	Stadion Lehen, Salzburg, Austria	Hungary	2–0	3–0	Friendly	
7	19 June 1990	Stadio Artemio Franchi, Florence, Italy	United States	1–0	2–1	1990 FIFA World Cup	
8	21 August 1990	Praterstadion, Vienna, Austria	Switzerland	1–0	1–3	Friendly	
9	31 October 1990	Red Star Stadium, Belgrade, Serbia	Yugoslavia	1–0	1–4	UEFA Euro 1992 qualifying	
10	14 April 1992	Praterstadion, Vienna, Austria	Lithuania	1–0	4–0	Friendly	
11	28 October 1992	Praterstadion, Vienna, Austria	Israel	5–2	5–2	1994 FIFA World Cup qualification	
12	11 June 1995	Lansdowne Road, Dublin, Ireland	Republic of Ireland	2–1	3–1	UEFA Euro 1996 qualifying	
13	27 March 1996	Ernst-Happel-Stadion, Vienna, Austria	Switzerland	1–0	1–0	Friendly	

=== Managerial ===
Team	From	To	Record							
Team	From	To	M	W	D	L	GF	GA	GD	Win %
1. Simmeringer SC	—									
PSV Team für Wien	—									
ASK Schwadorf	—									
1. Simmeringer SC	—									
FAC Team für Wien	—									
Austria Wien (A)	21 February 2014	22 March 2015	34	17	9	8	73	47	+26	50.00
Austria Wien	22 March 2015	3 June 2015	14	4	5	5	15	17	−2	28.57
Austria Wien (A)	22 June 2015	Present	30	10	9	11	45	39	+6	33.33

== Honours ==
Austria Wien

- Austrian Football Bundesliga: 1984, 1985, 1991, 1992, 1993
- Austrian Cup: 1990, 1992, 1994
