= Alain Sutter =

Swiss football former player (born 1968)

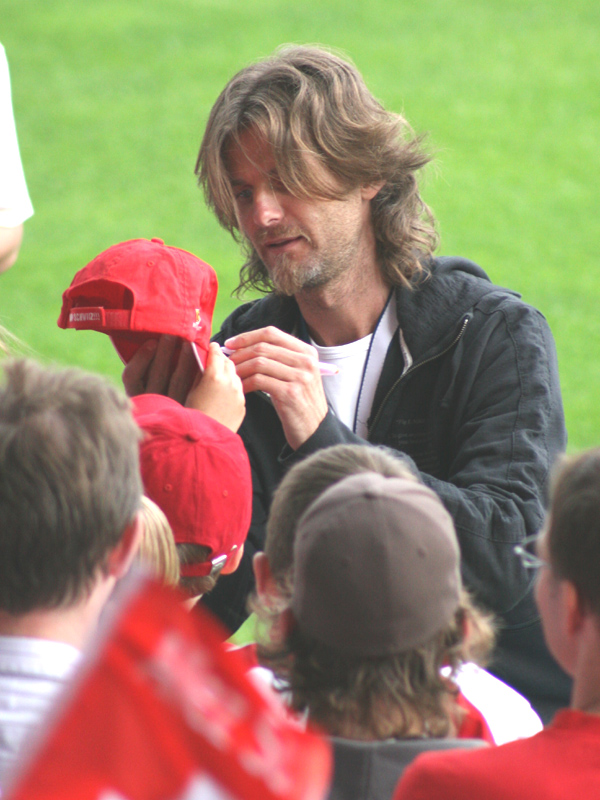
- Sutter in 2008

Personal information
- Date of birth: 22 January 1968 (age 58)
- Place of birth: Bern, Switzerland
- Height: 1.78 m (5 ft 10 in)
- Position: Midfielder

Youth career
- 1973–1985: SC Bümpliz 78

Senior career*
Years	Team	Apps	(Gls)
1985–1993	Grasshoppers	202	(36)
1987–1988	→ Young Boys (loan)	28	(5)
1993–1994	1. FC Nürnberg	29	(5)
1994–1995	Bayern Munich	22	(1)
1995–1997	SC Freiburg	45	(5)
1997–1998	Dallas Burn	25	(2)
Total		351	(54)

International career
1985–1996	Switzerland	68	(5)
- * Club domestic league appearances and goals

Alain Sutter (born 22 January 1968) is a Swiss former professional footballer who played as a midfielder. He is currently the sporting director of Grasshopper Club Zurich.

== Playing career ==
Born in Bern, Sutter played youth football for SC Bümpliz 78, before beginning his professional career in 1985 with Grasshoppers, one of Switzerland's most storied clubs. After spending the 1987–88 season on loan at BSC Young Boys, he was ready to take his place in the Grasshoppers first team, where he remained until the 1993–94 season, when he decided to move to Germany to play with 1. FC Nürnberg.

After Sutter's impressive performances during the 1994 FIFA World Cup, Germany's most successful club, Bayern Munich, quickly signed the midfielder where he played for one season, before moving again this time to SC Freiburg. In 1997, he transferred to Major League Soccer in the United States, where he signed for the Dallas Burn (now FC Dallas). He played one season in Dallas but his tenure there was cut short when, during training in early 1998, he stepped awkwardly in a hole of the practice field (the Burn was using the facilities of a high school at that time) and the injury forced him to retire. He ended his career with 68 caps and five goals for the Swiss national team.

== Retirement ==
Sutter was a football expert and commentator for Swiss television from 1998 to 2017.

He became the sporting director of FC St. Gallen on 3 January 2018.

On 5 May 2025, he was appointed as sporting director of Grasshopper Club Zurich.

== Controversies ==
Sutter was the main force behind a controversy in 1995. Before an important match for the Swiss team, he unfolded a banner to protest against France testing the atom bomb.

== Honours ==
Grasshoppers

- Swiss Championship: 1989–90, 1990–91
- Swiss Cup: 1988–89, 1989–90
- Swiss Super Cup: 1989

Bayern Munich

- UEFA Cup: 1995–96

Individual

- MLS All-Star: 1997

=== International ===
International goals for Switzerland

Score and results list Switzerland's goal tally first.

#	Date	Venue	Opponent	Score	Result	Competition
1.	21 September 1988	Stade Josy Barthel, Luxembourg, Luxembourg	Luxembourg	1–0	4–1	1990 FIFA World Cup qualification
2.	14 November 1990	Stadio Olimpico, Serravalle, San Marino	San Marino	1–0	4–0	UEFA Euro 1992 qualification
3.	25 March 1992	Lansdowne Road, Dublin, Ireland	Republic of Ireland	1–0	1–2	Friendly
4.	22 June 1994	Pontiac Silverdome, Detroit, United States	Romania	1–0	4–1	1994 FIFA World Cup
5.	6 September 1994	Stade de Tourbillon, Sion, Switzerland	United Arab Emirates	1–0	1–0	Friendly

== Published works ==
- Sutter, Alain (2015). Stressfrei glücklich sein. Altendorf: Giger Verlag. ISBN 978-3-905958-69-0.
- Sutter, Alain (2016). Herzensangelegenheit. Altendorf: Giger Verlag. ISBN 978-3-906872-00-1.
