= 1999–2000 Austrian Cup =

Tournament details
- Country: Austria

Final positions
- Champions: Grazer AK
- Runners-up: Austria Salzburg

The 1999–2000 Austrian Cup (German: ÖFB-Cup) was the 66th season of Austria's nationwide football cup competition. It commenced with the matches of the preliminary round in July 1999 and concluded with the Final on 16 May 2000. The competition was won by Grazer AK after beating Austria Salzburg 4–3 on penalties and hence qualifying for the 2000–01 UEFA Cup.

== First round ==
Team 1	Score	Team 2
30 July – 1 August 1999
ASK Kottingbrunn	2–0	SC Zwettl
Bruck/Leitha	0–0 (a.e.t.) (3–4 p)	1. SC Simmering
Himberg	3–3 (a.e.t.) (2–3 p)	Kremser SC
Rohrbach	1–0	Wiener Neudorf
Schrems	12–0	SR Donaufeld
Oberwart	3–1	Tulln
Landhaus	3–1	Retz
SV Würmla	7–0	Güssing
Lichtenau	0–3	SV Schwechat
St. Peter	2–3	SV Stockerau
Hundsheim	3–1	SV Horn
FC Waidhofen an der Ybbs	1–0	DSG Union Perg
FAC Team für Wien	2–1	Hirm
Kukmirn	1–1 (a.e.t.) (5–3 p)	SV Langenrohr
Neudörfl	0–5	SV Mattersburg
Klingenbach	5–0	Slovan HAC
6 August 1999
Vöcklamarkt	1–0	St.Florian
LASK Amateure	2–4	Eintracht Wels
Hertha Wels	1–2	SV Gmunden
Anger	3–0	Kindberg
TSV Hartberg	3–0	Zeltweg
7 August 1999
GAK Amateure	1–0	Hallwang
ASK Voitsberg	5–1	SAK Klagenfurt
Hartberg Umg.	2–1	Pöllau
SV St. Veit	0–1	Bad Bleiberg
Rapid Lienz	0–1 (a.e.t.)	ASK Köflach
FC Blau-Weiss Linz	1–4	Ranshofen
Wolfsberger AC	2–0	Bleiburg
SV Spittal an der Drau	2–0	FC Gratkorn
ASKÖ Pasching	3–0	Schwertberg
10 August 1999
Austria Salzburg Amateure	1–0 (a.e.t.)	Hallwang
USK Anif	0–3	SV Ried Amateure
SAK 1914	4–2	SV Grieskirchen
FC Lustenau	1–0	FC Kufstein
Tirol InnsbruckAmateure	3–1	SPG Axams/Götzens
SPG Reichenau	5–2	Jenbach
SC Kundl	2–2 (a.e.t.) (4–5 p)	SV Seekirchen 1945
Puch	2–4	ASKÖ Donau Linz
11 August 1999
Sturm Graz Amateure	1–3	St.Michael
SC Rheindorf Altach	3–0	Lustenau Amateure
FC Hard	3–0	SV Hall
17 August 1999
Austria Wien Amateure	3–2 (a.e.t.)	Fortuna
Leibnitz/F.Solva	2–0 (a.e.t.)	Kapfenberger SV
25 August 1999
Polizei Feuerwehr	4–1	Rapid Wien Amateure

== Second round ==
31 August 1999	Waidhofen/Ybbs	0–3	Austria Lustenau
			Benneker 32'; Regtop 27'; Schneidhofer 90+1'	Referee: Hannes Birgmann

8 September 1999	Polizei Feuerwehr	2–0	Austria Wien Amateure	Wien
	Puza 10'; Schawlo 71'			Stadium: Polizeisportplatz

25 October 1999	Kremser SC	0–3	SC Untersiebenbrunn	Krems
19:45 GMT	Sladecek (yellow card) 60' (red card)		Szanto 18'; Schandl 65'; Rosenegger 82'	Stadium: Sepp Doll-Stadion; Attendance: 600; Referee: Christian Werschnik

25 October 1999	SV Rohrbach	0–3	FCN St. Pölten	Rohrbach
			Hindmarch 34'; Metlitzki 62', 65'	Referee: Richard Kern

26 October 1999	ASK Klingenbach	1–5	Austria Salzburg	Klingenbach
	Kolowrat 34'		Nikolić 35'; Glieder 38'; Koejoe 59'; Ibertsberger 61'; Aufhauser 82'	Attendance: 1,200; Referee: Wolfgang Sowa

26 October 1999	ASK Kottingbrunn	4–1	St.Michael	Kottingbrunn
	Swoboda 26', 57'; Stern 85', 90+4'		Tatschl 68'	Attendance: 750; Referee: Wojciech Gorgon

26 October 1999	ASK Köflach	1–1 (a.e.t.) (5–3 p)	SK Vorwärts Steyr	Köflach
	Bernsteiner 67'; Tinnacher (red card) 119'		Hartl 76' (pen.); Woldeab (yellow card) 80' (red card)	Attendance: 850; Referee: Herbert Greschonig

26 October 1999	BSV Bad Bleiberg	3–2	SV Hundsheim	Bad Bleiberg
	Gijzen 47' (pen.), 68', 73'; Boonen (red card) 44'		Haas 44' (pen.), 48'; Tomaskovic (yellow card) 70' (red card)	Stadium: Drei-Lärchen-Stadio; Attendance: 1,000; Referee: Johann Hechtl

26 October 1999	ASKÖ Donau Linz	0–1	First Vienna	Linz
			ten Heuvel 57'	Stadium: ASKÖ Donau-Platz; Attendance: 1,000; Referee: Thomas Steiner

26 October 1999	Grazer AK Amateure	0–2	SV Ried	Graz
			Jank 1'; Lauwers 42'	Attendance: 500; Referee: Wolfgang Smole

26 October 1999	SK Eintracht Wels	2–5	Austria Salzburg Amateure	Wels
	Topf 46'; Pfister 73'		Keil 7'; Ivinger 19'; Spiric 31', 75'; Hiller 89'	Attendance: 300; Referee: Robert Weber

26 October 1999	Tirol Innsbruck Amateure	1–2	FC Kärnten	Innsbruck
	Đulić 51'		Aigner 62'; Schoppitsch 81'	Stadium: Tivoli; Attendance: 100; Referee: Wolfgang Smole

26 October 1999	FAC Team für Wien	2–1	FC Lustenau 07	Wien
	Patocka 4'; Radisavljevic 27'		Dorner 24'	Stadium: FAC-Platz; Attendance: 380; Referee: Markus Mayr

26 October 1999	TSV Hartberg	0–3	ASKÖ Pasching	Hartberg
			Zogovic 32'; Huspek 42'; Auer 78'	Attendance: 400; Referee: Franz Schwarzl

26 October 1999	Admira Landhaus	1–6	SC Bregenz	Wien
	Wildprat 32'		Grubor 5'; Bleyer 14'; Gaißmayer 27'; Tomic 45' (pen.); Gager 85' (pen.); Mattle 89'	Attendance: 600; Referee: Franz Mostböck

26 October 1999	Kukmirn	0–0 (a.e.t.) (6-7 p)	1. Simmeringer SC	Kukmirn
				Attendance: 400; Referee: Gernot Reinprecht

26 October 1999	SC Rheindorf Altach	2–1	Schrems	Altach
	Gussnig 45' (pen.); Guem 66'		Mrsic 1'	Stadium: Stadion Schnabelholz; Attendance: 500; Referee: Markus Freund

26 October 1999	SV Anger	0–4	DSV Leoben	Anger
			Dampfhofer 51'; Sekic 60'; Linz 70'; Fuchs 75'	Attendance: 800; Referee: Werner Winkelbauer

26 October 1999	SV Gmunden	1–2	SV Wörgl	Gmunden
	Qubrelji 68'		Silberberger 51'; Blizenec 63'	Attendance: 900; Referee: Luis Hofmann

26 October 1999	SV Oberwart	3–2	FC Hard	Oberwart
	Habeler 2', 24'; Korosec 36'		Dimorelli 53'; Klockner 81'	Attendance: 250; Referee: Johann Gruber

26 October 1999	SV Schwechat	0–7	FC Tirol Innsbruck	Schwechat
			Mair 16'; Scharrer 21', 70', 81'; Kirchler 32', 58'; Barisic 66'	Stadium: Rudolf-Tonn-Stadion; Attendance: 1,500; Referee: Wolfgang Falb

26 October 1999	SV Spittal	6–2 (a.e.t.)	SV Mattersburg	Spittal an der Drau
	Popovic 48'; Messner 54'; Rexhaj 102'; Moser 107'; Schönherr 114', 115'		Kantauer 61'; Mörz 68'	Stadium: Goldeck-Stadion; Attendance: 600; Referee: Gottfried Schuiki

26 October 1999	SV Stockerau	1–2 (a.e.t.)	SV Seekirchen	Stockerau
	Andreas Poiger 83' (pen.)		Scheffenacker 27'; Bauer 40' (pen.)	Stadium: Alte Au; Attendance: 700; Referee: Andreas Fellinger

26 October 1999	SV Würmla	0–3	Austria Wien	Würmla
			Mayrleb 9'; Sobczak 19'; Plamauer 55' (o.g.)	Attendance: 2,000; Referee: Gerald Lehner

26 October 1999	SVG Reichenau	1–4	WSG Wattens	Reichenau
	Wohlgenannt 51'		Eder 13'; Gruber 19'; Hobel 44'; Stanger 70'	Stadium: Stadion Reichenau; Attendance: 400; Referee: Michael Daxauer

26 October 1999	SVL Flavia Solva	0–2	Admira Wacker Mödling	Wagna
			Wieger 65', 85'	Stadium: Römerstadion; Attendance: 300; Referee: Manfred Krassnitzer

26 October 1999	Salzburger AK 1914	3–3 (a.e.t.) (4–5 p)	TSV Hartberg	Salzburg
	Derflinger 33', 120+5'; Zieher 112'		Archan 78' (pen.); Schäffer 95', 109'	Attendance: 200; Referee: Thomas Einwaller

26 October 1999	Union Vöcklamarkt	0–2	LASK Linz	Vöcklamarkt
	Kramer (red card) 90'		Mehlem 25'; Kauz 80'	Attendance: 3,000; Referee: Dietmar Drabek

27 October 1999	WSV ATSV Ranshofen	1–1 (a.e.t.) (4–1 p)	Rapid Wien	Vöcklamarkt
	Aigner 30'		Wetl 21'; Wallner (red card) 77'	Attendance: 2,500; Referee: Hannes Birgmann

16 November 1999	Wolfsberger AC	1–4	Sturm Graz	Wolfsberg
	Kirisits 11'; Jesse (red card) 61'		Feldhofer 16', 66'; Vastić 35', 63' (pen.)	Stadium: Stadion Wolfsberg; Attendance: 3,500; Referee: Thomas Steiner

21 March 2000	ASK Voitsberg	1–3 (a.e.t.)	Grazer AK	Voitsberg
	Lang 71' (pen.)		Akwuegbu 83', 96', 115' (pen.); Dmitrović (red card) 87'	Attendance: 2,000; Referee: Stefan Meßner

== Third round ==
4 April 2000	1. Simmeringer SC	2–1	SV Ried	Wien
	Weigl 30'; Lazarevic 82'		Glasner 35'	Stadium: Simmeringer Sportplatz; Attendance: 1,800; Referee: Johann Almer

4 April 2000	ASK Kottingbrunn	1–5	Grazer AK	Kottingbrunn
	Slunecko 85'		Lipa 8', 90'; Aloisi 47'; Akwuegbu 57' (pen.); Ramusch 64'	Attendance: 1,800; Referee: Robert Sedlacek

4 April 2000	ASK Köflach	0–3 (a.e.t.)	SC Untersiebenbrunn
			Rosenegger 93'; Szanto 113' (pen.); Rosenbichler 115'	Attendance: 1,000; Referee: Manfred Krassnitzer

4 April 2000	ASKÖ Pasching	1–1 (a.e.t.) (5–4 p)	Sturm Graz	Pasching
	Zogovic 56'		Korsós 18'	Stadium: Waldstadion; Attendance: 3,300; Referee: Richard Kern
	Penalties
	Laimer (penalty scored); Zeller (penalty scored); Zogovic (penalty scored); Auer (penalty scored); Myatlitski (penalty scored)		(penalty scored) Vastić; (penalty scored) Martens; (penalty scored) Schopp; (penalty scored) Prilasnig; (penalty missed) Minavand

4 April 2000	BSV Bad Bleiberg	0–3	FC Kärnten	Bad Bleiberg
			Holterman 3' (o.g.); Kollmann 38'; Luhový 47'	Stadium: Drei Lärchenstadion; Attendance: 4,000; Referee: Werner Winkelbauer

4 April 2000	FC Tirol Innsbruck	2–0	SC Bregenz	Innsbruck
	Baur 25' (pen.); Glieder 82'			Stadium: Tivoli; Attendance: 3,000; Referee: Hannes Birgmann

4 April 2000	Floridsdorfer AC	0–3	First Vienna	Wien
			Holemar 77'; Puskás 88'; Wachter 90+1'	Stadium: FAC-Platz; Attendance: 700; Referee: Gottfried Schuiki

4 April 2000	SC Rheindorf Altach	0–2	Admira Wacker Mödling	Altach
			Micheu 42'; Ozegovic 84'	Stadium: Stadion Schnabelholz; Attendance: 600; Referee: Franz Maislinger

4 April 2000	SV Seekirchen	0–4	WSG Wattens	Seekirchen
			Damm 15', 43'; Wagner 52' (o.g.); Eder 56'	Attendance: 200; Referee: Thomas Steiner

4 April 2000	SV Spittal	0–2	SV Austria Salzburg	Spittal an der Drau
			Polster 61'; Kitzbichler 72'	Stadium: Goldeck-Stadion; Attendance: 2,500; Referee: Michael Daxauer

4 April 2000	TSV Hartberg	0–1	Austria Wien	Hartberg
			Wagner 69'	Stadium: Stadion Hartberg; Attendance: 2,000; Referee: Bernhard Brugger

4 April 2000	WSV ATSV Ranshofen	0–3 (a.e.t.)	LASK Linz	Ranshofen
			Dadi 96', 100'; Lichtenwagner 115'	Attendance: 3,000; Referee: Franz Mostböck

5 April 2000	Polizei/Feurwehr Wien	0–5	DSV Leoben	Wien
			Früstük 25', 79'; Prendergast 70'; Weissenberger 80'; Aflenzer 81'	Attendance: 300; Referee: Franz Schwarzl

5 April 2000	SV Braunau	4–2	Austria Lustenau	Braunau am Inn
	Forster 22'; Vujić 28'; Jerabek 50'; Dadi 89' (pen.)		Enzenebner 6'; Echteld 81'	Stadium: Grenzlandstadion; Attendance: 500; Referee: Wolfgang Falb

5 April 2000	SV Oberwart	2–5	SV Wörgl	Oberwart
	Habeler 1'; Halper 15'		Gaudenzi 18'; Unterrainer 56'; Silberberger 67', 82'; Schwarz 90'	Stadium: Informstadion; Attendance: 400; Referee: Wolfgang Sowa

Austria Salzburg Amateure were awarded a walkover against FCN St Pölten, as St Pölten were declared bankrupt

== Fourth round ==
11 April 2000	1. Simmeringer SC	0–1	Austria Salzburg Amateure	Wien
			Szewczyk 57'	Stadium: Simmeringer Sportplatz; Attendance: 5,000; Referee: Franz Mostböck

11 April 2000	ASKÖ Pasching	5–1	WSG Wattens	Pasching
	Zogovic 17', 25', 49'; Aslan 28', 51'		Stanger 2'	Stadium: Waldstadion; Attendance: 1,200; Referee: Wolfgang Sowa

11 April 2000	Austria Wien	1–0	LASK Linz	Wien
	Milinovič 29' (o.g.)			Stadium: Franz Horr Stadium; Attendance: 2,700; Referee: Konrad Plautz

11 April 2000	DSV Leoben	3–1	FC Kärnten	Leoben
	Unger 15'; Rinnhofer 54'; Krautberger 65'		Vorderegger 8'	Stadium: Stadion Donawitz; Attendance: 1,200; Referee: Bernhard Brugger

11 April 2000	Grazer AK	3–1	SV Wörgl	Graz
	Tutu 36', 61'; Akwuegbu 78'		Jörgensen 90+1'	Stadium: Arnold-Schwarzenegger-Stadion; Attendance: 1,500; Referee: Wolfgang Falb

11 April 2000	Austria Salzburg Amateure	1–3	Admira Wacker Mödling	Salzburg
	Promberger 18'		Linimair 23', 77'; Fellner 57'	Stadium: Stadion Lehen; Attendance: 400; Referee: Manfred Krassnitzer

11 April 2000	SV Braunau	1–1 (a.e.t.) (4–3 p)	SC Untersiebenbrunn	Braunau am Inn
	Letocha 43'		Szanto 47'; Szanto (red card) 60'	Stadium: Grenzlandstadion; Attendance: 600; Referee: Erwin Hänsel
	Penalties
	Jerabek (penalty scored); Weidinger (penalty scored); Feitsch (penalty scored); Dadi (penalty scored); Vujic (penalty missed)		(penalty scored) Sekerlioglu; (penalty scored) Briza; (penalty missed) Sukulia; (penalty scored) Nemeth; (penalty missed) Gager

11 April 2000	First Vienna	0–1	Tirol Innsbruck	Wien
			Mair 65'	Stadium: Hohe Warte Stadium; Attendance: 1,500; Referee: Dietmar Drabek

== Quarter-finals ==
18 April 2000	ASKÖ Pasching	2–0	Tirol Innsbruck	Pasching
	Aslan 24'; Zogovic 44'			Stadium: Waldstadion; Attendance: 5,500; Referee: Werner Winkelbauer

18 April 2000	Austria Wien	0–0 (a.e.t.) (5–3 p)	DSV Leoben	Wien
				Stadium: Franz Horr Stadium; Attendance: 2,000; Referee: Wolfgang Falb
	Penalties
	Mayrleb (penalty scored); Rakhimov (penalty scored); Ježek (penalty scored); Darasz (penalty scored); Wagner (penalty scored)		(penalty missed) Guggi; (penalty scored) Steiglmair; (penalty scored) Hörmann; (penalty scored) Nemeth; (penalty scored) Aflenzer

18 April 2000	Grazer AK	2–1 (a.e.t.)	SV Braunau	Graz
	Kulovits 40'; Aloisi 112'; Čeh (yellow card) 113' (red card) 115'		Schriebl 71'	Stadium: Arnold-Schwarzenegger-Stadion; Attendance: 2,500; Referee: Hannes Birgmann

18 April 2000	Austria Salzburg	5–0	Admira Wacker Mödling	Salzburg
	Szewczyk 26'; Aufhauser 37'; Hütter 51', 78'; Meyssen 67'			Stadium: Stadion Lehen; Attendance: 3,500; Referee: Robert Sedlacek

== Semi-finals ==
2 May 2000	ASKÖ Pasching	0–1	Grazer AK	Pasching
			Akwuegbu 44'	Stadium: Waldstadion; Attendance: 6,000; Referee: Fritz Stuchlik

2 May 2000	Austria Salzburg	3–2	Austria Wien	Salzburg
	Polster 7', 75'; Laeßig 72'; Aufhauser (yellow card) 80' (red card) 89'		Hopfer 17'; Plassnegger 67'; Scharner (yellow card) 21' (red card) 23'	Stadium: Stadion Lehen; Attendance: 10,000; Referee: Stefan Meßner

== Final ==
=== Details ===
16 May 2000
20:30

Grazer AK	2–2 (a.e.t.)	Austria Salzburg
Pamić 3' (pen.), 34'	(Report)	Szewczyk 44'; Aufhauser 90+3'
Penalties
Kulovits (penalty missed); Tutu (penalty scored); Pamić (penalty scored); Lipa (penalty scored); Ehmann (penalty scored)	4–3	(penalty scored) Laeßig; (penalty scored) Meyssen; (penalty missed) Kitzbichler; (penalty scored) Sabitzer; (penalty missed) Lipcsei

Ernst-Happel-Stadion, Wien
Attendance: 9,200
Referee: Manfred Schüttengruber

GK	(Austria) Franz Almer
DF	(Austria) Andreas Lipa	(yellow card) 89'
DF	(Austria) Anton Ehmann	(yellow card) 67'
DF	(Austria) Gregor Pötscher
DF	(Austria) Dieter Ramusch
DF	(Federal Republic of Yugoslavia) Boban Dmitrović		(substituted off) 79'
MF	(Slovenia) Aleš Čeh
MF	(Austria) Enrico Kulovits
MF	(Austria) Joachim Standfest		(substituted off) 85'
FW	(Nigeria) Benedict Akwuegbu		(substituted off) 66'
FW	(Croatia) Igor Pamić	(yellow card) 73'
Substitutes:
MF	(Austria) Gernot Sick		(substituted on) 79'
MF	(Austria) Martin Amerhauser		(substituted on) 89'
FW	(Ghana) Skelley Adu Tutu		(substituted on) 66'
Manager:
(Austria) Werner Gregoritsch

GK	(Hungary) Szabolcs Sáfár
DF	(Poland) Roman Szewczyk		(substituted off) 97'
DF	(Austria) Thomas Winklhofer
DF	(Austria) Christoph Jank
DF	(Germany) Heiko Laeßig	(yellow card) 52'
DF	(Austria) Adolf Hütter	(yellow card) 9'	(substituted off) 71'
MF	(Federal Republic of Yugoslavia) Slađan Nikolić
MF	(Austria) René Aufhauser
MF	(Austria) Richard Kitzbichler
FW	(Austria) Toni Polster	(yellow card) 27'	(substituted off) 56'
FW	(Austria) Gerhard Struber
Substitutes:
MF	(Hungary) Péter Lipcsei		(substituted on) 97'
MF	(Belgium) Harold Meyssen		(substituted on) 71'
FW	(Austria) Herfried Sabitzer		(substituted on) 56'
Manager:
(Federal Republic of Yugoslavia) Miroslav Polak

Match rules

- 90 minutes.
- 30 minutes of extra-time if necessary.
- Penalty shootout if scores still level.
