= Banovits =

Banovits is a surname. Notable people with the surname include:

- Christian Banovits (born 1981), Austrian footballer
- Kajetán Banovits (1841–1915), Hungarian engineer and sports leader
