= Kajetán Banovits =

Hungarian engineer and sports leader

- Born: Kajetán Banovits de Sopronszentmárton; 10 August 1841; Mátyócvajkóc, Hungary
- Died: 7 December 1915 (aged 74); Budapest, Hungary
- Resting place: Farkasréti Cemetery
- Citizenship: Hungarian
- Occupations: Engineer; Sports leader
- Known for: 3rd president of the Hungarian Football Federation

Director of the Közlekedési Múzeum
- In office 1898–1915

President of the Hungarian Football Federation
- In office 1903–1906
- Preceded by: Viktor Rákosi
- Succeeded by: Béla Kárpáti

Kajetán Banovits de Sopronszentmárton (10 August 1841 – 7 December 1915) was a Hungarian engineer and sports leader who served as the third president of the Hungarian Football Federation from 1903 to 1906. He also played a fundamental role in the creation of the Hungarian Technical and Transportation Museum, which he directed from its foundation in 1898 until he died in 1915.

== Early life and education ==
Kajetán Banovits was born in Mátyócvajkóc on 10 August 1841, as the son of Emánuel Banovits and Rozália Berzeviczy, a poor noble family.

He completed his secondary school in Ungvár before enrolling at the Faculty of Railway Construction Engineering at the Budapest University of Technology and Economics, where he earned a railway engineering degree in 1863.

== Professional career ==
Banovits began his career as an assistant railway construction engineer at the Pest–Losonc Railway, and he later took on similar roles at other railways, such as the Cluj–Nagyvard and the Charles Bridge–Riume. In 1867, he became the head of engineering of the central department at the Košice–Oderberg Railway, and a few years later, he became the head of the General Inspectorate of Railway Construction. At the time, Banovits had mainly distinguished himself with his practical work, but thanks to his managerial appointments, he also developed his theoretical knowledge and organizational skills, which he ended up applying at the Hungarian State Railways (MÁV), being credited with organizing the MÁV workshop and towing service. After this, his career progressed steadily, as he then served as MÁV's chief inspector in the early 1880s, followed by his role as director of MÁV's construction and mechanical engineering department, a position that he held for 15 years, from 1890 to 1905.

Banovits was recognized internationally as an expert in railway safety systems and safety devices, having pioneered numerous innovations in railway lighting and signaling technology, including the invention of an electric railway remote signal, for which he was awarded the grand medal at the 1885 Hungarian National Exhibition. Beyond his technical contributions, he also conducted extensive research into the history of railways, laying the groundwork for the collection of the Hungarian Technical and Transportation Museum, which opened its doors to the public on 1 May 1899, mainly thanks to the tireless efforts of Banovits, who after much insistence, finally managed to convince the Minister for Commerce, Baron Ernő Dániel, to approve the museum's creation, and then serving as its director from 1898 to 1915.

Banovits received numerous awards for his contributions to the development of transportation, such as being knighted by King Franz Joseph I of Austria on 2 February 1912. He was also personally invited to the Petersburg congress in 1904 due to being a member of the International Association of Material Testers.

== Writing career ==
In his 20s, Banovits edited a Danube steamship magazine, and in 1898, he published the work Geschichte der Eisenbahnen der Oesterreichisch-Ungarischen Monarchie ("History of the railways of the Austro-Hungarian Empire").

== Sporting career ==
In 1903, the 62-year-old Banovits, then director of MÁV, was elected president of the Hungarian Football Association, thus replacing Viktor Rákosi. He held this position for three years, until 1906, when he replaced by Béla Kárpáti.

== Death ==
Banovits married twice, first with Lujza Kaiser, with whom he had two children, Lívia and Alice; and then married Banovits Ágnes, with whom he had a further two children, Emil and Róza.

Banovits died in Budapest on 7 December 1915, at the age of 74.
