= Kulovits =

Kulovits is a surname. Notable people with the surname include:

- Enrico Kulovits (born 1974), Austrian footballer and manager
- Stefan Kulovits (born 1983), Austrian footballer
