= Markus Holemar =

Association football player

Personal information
- Date of birth: 18 June 1976 (age 50)
- Place of birth: Austria
- Position: Midfielder

Senior career*
Years	Team	Apps	(Gls)
199x-1996	1. Simmeringer SC		
1996-1998	FK Austria Wien	0	(0)
- Prater SV→(loan)
1998	Heart of Midlothian F.C.	0	(0)
1999	SK Vorwärts Steyr	12	(0)
1999-2000	First Vienna FC	21	(3)
2000-2001	DSV Leoben	28	(7)
2001-200x	LASK	1	(0)
2001-200x	DSV Leoben	6+	(0+)
2003-2004	SV Schwechat		
2004-2005	1. Simmeringer SC		
2005-2007	SKN St. Pölten		
2007	Wiener Sport-Club		
2007-2009	SV Horn		
2009	SKU Amstetten		
2009-2010	FC Marchfeld Donauauen		
2010-2011	SK Schwadorf		
2011	ASC Götzendorf		
2011-2012	FK Hainburg		
2012	SV Haitzendorf		
2012-2013	SC Ostbahn XI	13	(2)
2013	SV Würmla		
2013-2014	ASK Eggendorf		
2014-2015	SC Lassee		
2015-2016	UFC Obritz		
2016-2017	1. Simmeringer SC		
2017-2019	SC Wolfsthal		
2019	SC Ostbahn XI		
2019-	SC Wolfsthal		
- * Club domestic league appearances and goals

Markus Holemar (born 18 June 1976 in Austria) is an Austrian footballer who plays for SC Wolfsthal in his home country.

== Career ==
Holemar started his senior career with 1. Simmeringer SC. In 1996, he signed for FK Austria Wien in the Austrian Football Bundesliga, where he made four appearances and scored zero goals. After that, he played for Scottish club Heart of Midlothian, and Austrian clubs SK Vorwärts Steyr, First Vienna, DSV Leoben, LASK, SV Schwechat, 1. Simmeringer SC, SKN St. Pölten, Wiener Sport-Club, SV Horn, SKU Amstetten, Marchfeld Donauauen, SK Schwadorf, ASC Götzendorf, FK Hainburg, SV Haitzendorf, SC Ostbahn XI, SV Würmla, ASK Eggendorf, SC Lassee, UFC Obritz, and SC Wolfsthal, where he now plays.
