= List of football clubs in Hungary =

This is a list of association football clubs located in Hungary, sorted by league and division within the Hungarian football league system, as of the 2025–26 season. A total clubs compete in the Hungarian football pyramid, divided as follows:

National

- Nemzeti Bajnokság I (also known as NB I, with 12 clubs)
- Nemzeti Bajnokság II (also known as NB II, with 16 clubs)
- Nemzeti Bajnokság III (also known as NB III, with four regional subdivisions - Northeast (16 clubs), Northwest (16 clubs), Southeast (16 clubs) and Southwest (16 clubs) – for a total of 64 clubs)

County

- Megyei Bajnokság I (also known as MB I, with twenty county subdivisions - Bács-Kiskun (14 clubs), Baranya (15 clubs), Békés (10 clubs), Borsod-Abaúj-Zemplén (16 clubs), Budapest (16 clubs), Csongrád-Csanád (12 clubs), Fejér (15 clubs), Győr-Moson-Sopron (15 clubs), Heves (16 clubs), Jász-Nagykun-Szolnok (16 clubs), Komárom-Esztergom (12 clubs), Nógrád (15 clubs), Pest (16 clubs), Somogy (15 clubs), Szabolcs-Szatmár-Bereg (16 clubs), Tolna (9 clubs), Vas (16 clubs), Veszprém (16 clubs) and Zala (13 clubs)
- Megyei Bajnokság II (also known as MB II)
- Megyei Bajnokság III (also known as MB III)

== Fizz Liga (Top tier) ==
As of the start from 2025–26 season - 2025–26 season

Team	City	Stadium	Capacity	2024–25 season
Debrecen	Debrecen	Nagyerdei Stadion	20,340	9th
Diósgyőr	Miskolc	Diósgyőri Stadion	15,325	6th
Ferencváros	Budapest (Ferencváros)	Groupama Aréna	22,043	1st
Győr	Győr	ETO Park	15,600	4th
Kazincbarcika	Kazincbarcika	Városi Stadion (Mezőkövesd)	4,183	2nd (NB II)
Kisvárda	Kisvárda	Várkerti Stadion	2,993	1st (NB II)
MTK Budapest	Budapest	Hidegkuti Nándor Stadion	5,014	5th
Nyíregyháza	Balmazújváros	Városi Stadion	2,291	8th
Paks	Paks	Fehérvári úti Stadion	6,150	3rd
Puskás Akadémia	Felcsút	Pancho Aréna	3,816	2nd
Újpest	Budapest (Újpest)	Szusza Ferenc Stadion	12,670	7th
Zalaegerszeg	Zalaegerszeg	ZTE Aréna	11,200	10th

== Merkantil Bank Liga (Second tier) ==
As of the start from 2025–26 season - 2025–26 season

Team	City	Stadium	Capacity	2024–25 season
Ajka	Ajka	Városi Stadion	5,000	12th
Békéscsaba	Békéscsaba	Kórház utcai Stadion	4,963	14th
Budafok	Budapest (Budafok)	Promontor utcai Stadion	4,000	13th
BVSC	Budapest (Zugló)	Szőnyi úti Stadion	12,000	9th
Csákvár	Csákvár	Tersztyánszky Ödön Stadion	2,020	10th
Fehérvár	Székesfehérvár	MOL Aréna Sóstó	14,144	11th (NB I)
Honvéd	Budapest (Kispest)	Bozsik Aréna	8,000	8th
Kecskemét	Kecskemét	Széktói Stadion	6,320	12th (NB I)
Kozármisleny	Kozármisleny	Kozármislenyi Stadion	2,000	4th
Mezőkövesd	Mezőkövesd	Városi Stadion	4,183	6th
Karcag	Karcag	Ligeti úti Sporttelep	2,500	1st (NB III Northeast)
Soroksár	Budapest (Soroksár)	Szamosi Mihály Sportelep	5,000	11th
Szeged-Csanád	Szeged	Szent Gellért Fórum	8,136	7th
Szentlőrinc	Szentlőrinc	Szentlőrinci Sportpálya	1,020	5th
Tiszakécske	Tiszakécske	Városi Stadion	4,500	1st (NB III Southeast)
Vasas	Budapest (Angyalföld)	Illovszky Rudolf Stadion	5,154	3rd

== Nemzeti Bajnokság III (Third tier) ==
As of 1 July 2023 - 2023/24 season

=== Northeast ===
- Cigánd
- Debreceni EAC
- Debreceni VSC II
- Diósgyőr II
- Eger
- Gyöngyös
- Hatvan
- Karcag
- Kisvárda II
- Putnok
- Rákospalota
- Salgótarján
- Sényő
- Tiszafüred
- Tiszaújváros
- Újpest II

=== Northwest ===
- III. Kerület
- Balatonfüred
- Bicske
- Budaörs
- Csorna
- Dorog
- Gyirmót II
- Győr II
- Haladás VSE
- Kelen
- Komárom
- Puskás Akadémia II
- Sopron
- Tatabánya
- Veszprém
- Zalaegerszeg II

=== Southeast ===
- Békéscsaba 1912
- BKV Előre
- Budapest Honvéd II
- Cegléd
- Dabas
- ESMTK
- Füzesgyarmat
- Hódmezővásárhely
- Kecskemét II
- Körösladány
- Martfű
- Monor
- Pénzügyőr
- Szeged II
- Szolnok
- Vasas II

=== Southwest ===
- Dunaföldvár
- Dunaújváros
- Érd
- Fehérvár II
- Ferencváros II
- Gárdony
- Iváncsa
- Kaposvár
- Majos
- Mohács
- MTK Budapest II
- Nagykanizsa
- Paks II
- PEAC
- Szekszárd
- Szentlőrinc

== Other clubs ==
Other clubs, which competed in the First division earlier, but now are defunct, or play in lower leagues, include:

- Budapesti AK
- MFC Sopron
- Volán FC

== Clubs outside present-day Hungary ==
Clubs, which were either established in Hungary, or competed in Hungarian leagues before the Treaty of Trianon, or after the First and Second Vienna Awards, include:

- Nagyváradi AC (won the Nemzeti Bajnokság I in 1943/44, winners of Hungarian Eastern division league 1912/13)
- Kolozsvári AC (defunct - competed in the Nemzeti Bajnokság I from 1941 to 1944; bronze medalists in 1943/44, cup finalists in 1944)
- Kassai AC (defunct - competed in the Nemzeti Bajnokság I in 1939/40, winners of Hungarian Northern division league 1908/09, 1909/10, 1910/11, 1912/13 and the national regional final 1909, 1911)
- Újvidéki AC (defunct - competed in the Nemzeti Bajnokság I from 1941 to 1944)
- Ungvári AC (defunct - competed in the Nemzeti Bajnokság I in 1944)
- Temesvári Kinizsi (defunct - winners of Hungarian Southern division league 1916/17, 1917/18)
- Bácska Szabadkai AC (winners of Hungarian Southern division league 1908/09, 1909/10, 1912/13)
- Szabadkai Vasutas AC (defunct)
- Eperjesi TVE (winners of Hungarian Northern division league 1907/08)
- Homonnai AC
- Kolozsvári VSC (competed in the Nemzeti Bajnokság II from 1941 to 1944 as Kolozsvári MÁV)
- Nagyszalontai AC (competed in Nemzeti Bajnokság II between 1940 and 1944)
- Dunaszerdahelyi AC
- Nagybányai Phönix
- Nyitrai TVE
- Rimaszombat
- SK Rusj (competed in Nemzeti Bajnokság II between 1940 and 1944)
- Zsolnai TK
- Pozsonyi TE (the first non-Budapest club to give a player - Gyula Nirnsee - to the Hungary national team in 1907)

== See also ==
- Hungary national football team
- Hungarian Football Federation
