= Géza Jász =

Hungarian philosopher and sports leader

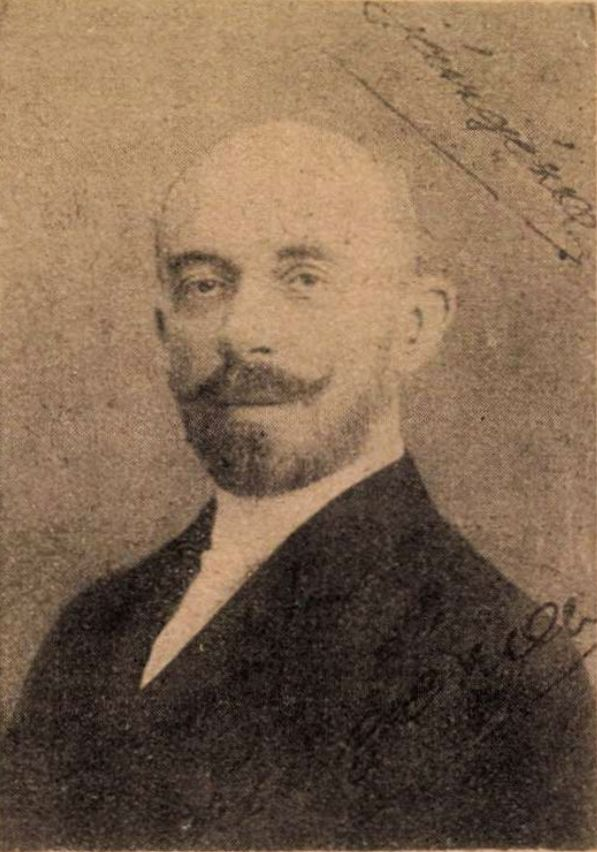
- Géza in 1928
- Born: 12 February 1863; Jobbágyi, Hungary
- Died: 11 February 1937 (aged 73); Budapest, Hungary
- Resting place: Fiume Road Graveyard
- Citizenship: Hungarian
- Occupations: Philosophical writer; Sports leader
- Known for: 1st president of the Hungarian Football Federation

1st President of the Hungarian Football Federation
- In office 1901–1902
- Succeeded by: Viktor Rákosi

Géza Jász (12 February 1863 – 11 February 1937) was a Hungarian lawyer, philosophical writer, and sports leader, who served as the first president of the Hungarian Football Federation in 1901–02.

== Early life and education ==
Born in Jobbágyi on 12 February 1863, Jász studied law before working as an accountant at the Hungarian Land Loan Institute.

== Philosophical career ==
"If we want something, we must really want it, not just half-heartedly, as most people do, but with all our might, and we must not shy away from any kind of work or suffering, then we will definitely achieve what we want."

— Jász.

Jász published his first philosophical work in 1893, at the age of 30. His ideas were closely linked to the worldview and perspectives of Tivadar Margó and Ottó Herman, but he later adopted Herbert Spencer's application of Darwinism to social structures. He also came into contact with both social democratic and bourgeois democratic writers thanks to his anti-religious and anticlerical views, stating that "Gods are born and die one after another, and new ones come to replace them as men change". He often wrote about how a man's will is more important than a man's faith, stating that "will is the surest guarantee of success" and "nothing can overcome the will".

In addition to philosophy, Jász was a passionate traveler who thus became involved in the tourist movement in his early youth. He contributed around fifty articles to Turisták Lapja ("Tourists' Newspaper"), advocated for increasing domestic travel, and for many years, organized the lectures of the Hungarian Tourist Association, where he held several positions, such as member of its Budapest department from 1892 to 1900, member of its central committee from 1911 to 1919, and finally its vice-president from 1920 until he died in 1937, during which time he played a key role in establishing several regional branches of the Hungarian Tourist Association.

== Sporting career ==
Jász was secretary general of the Hungarian Gymnastics Association for 10 years, from 1896 until 1906, and vice president of the Budapest Gymnastics Club in 1908. He was president of the Magyar Football Clubnak for 10 years, from 1896 until 1906, being thus one of the founding members of the Hungarian Football Federation on 19 January 1901 in a special room of the Prince István Hotel, which then elected Jász as its first president, a position that he held for one year, until 1902, when he replaced by Viktor Rákosi.

== Death ==
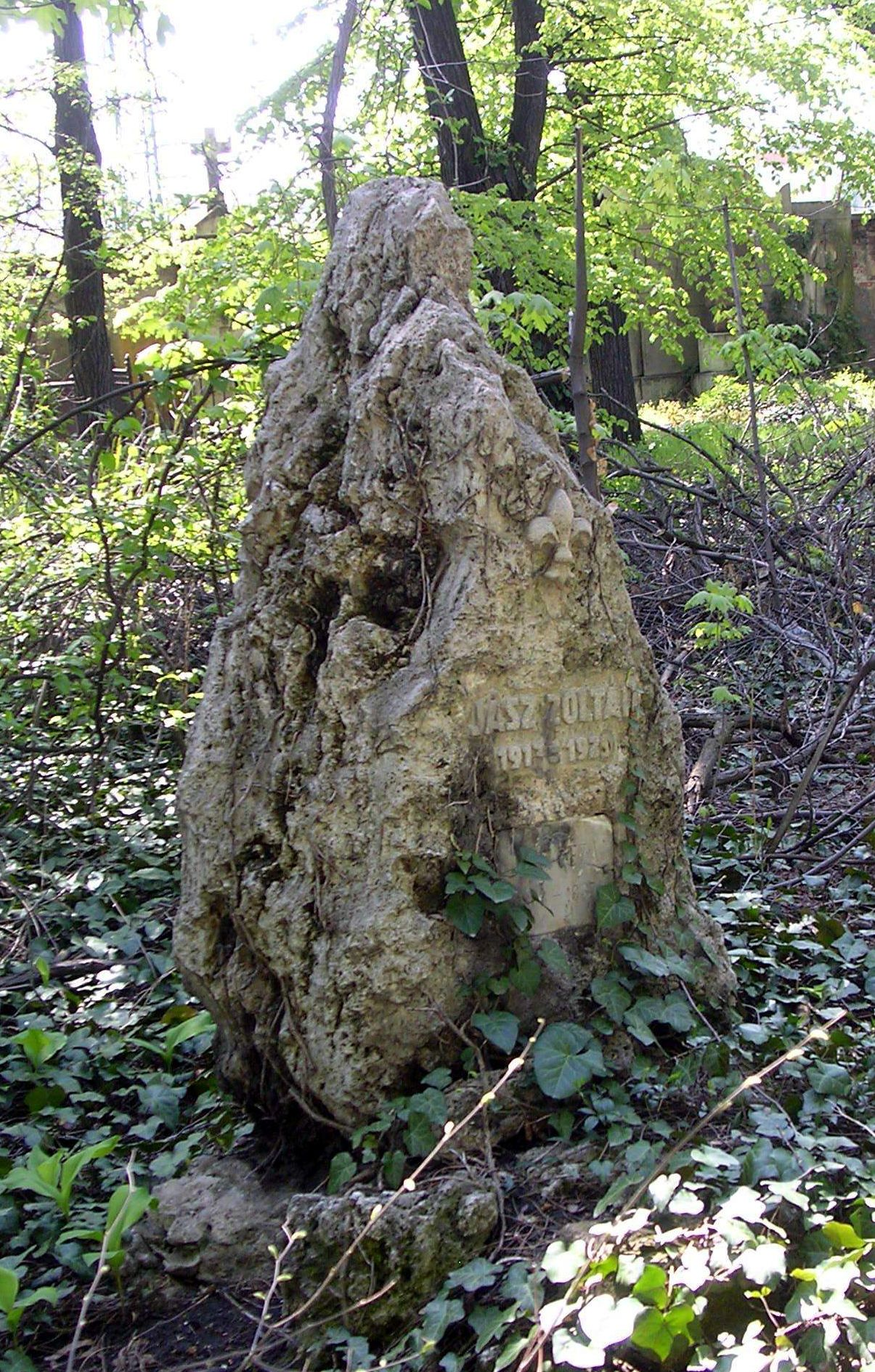
His grave in the Riumei Úti Cemetery (48/2-3-6) in 2008.

Banovits died in Budapest on 11 February 1937, at the age of 73, and was buried in the Fiume Road Graveyard, alongside his son Zoltán Jász (1913–1929), who died at the age of 16. The protected grave was renovated in 2022 with the cooperation of the Hungarian Football Association, the Hungarian Hiking Association, the Municipality of Jobbágyi, and the National Heritage Institute.

== Works ==
- "The Laws of Development, with Special Regard to Socioeconomic Life" (1893)
- "The Idea of the True, the Good, and the Beautiful" (1910)
- "The Cell as the Basic Form of Development" (1911)
- "The Philosophy of Religion" (Vol. I, 1915)
- "The Law of the Balance of the World" (1935)

Note: All of them were published in Budapest.
