= Mario Posch =

Austrian footballer and coach

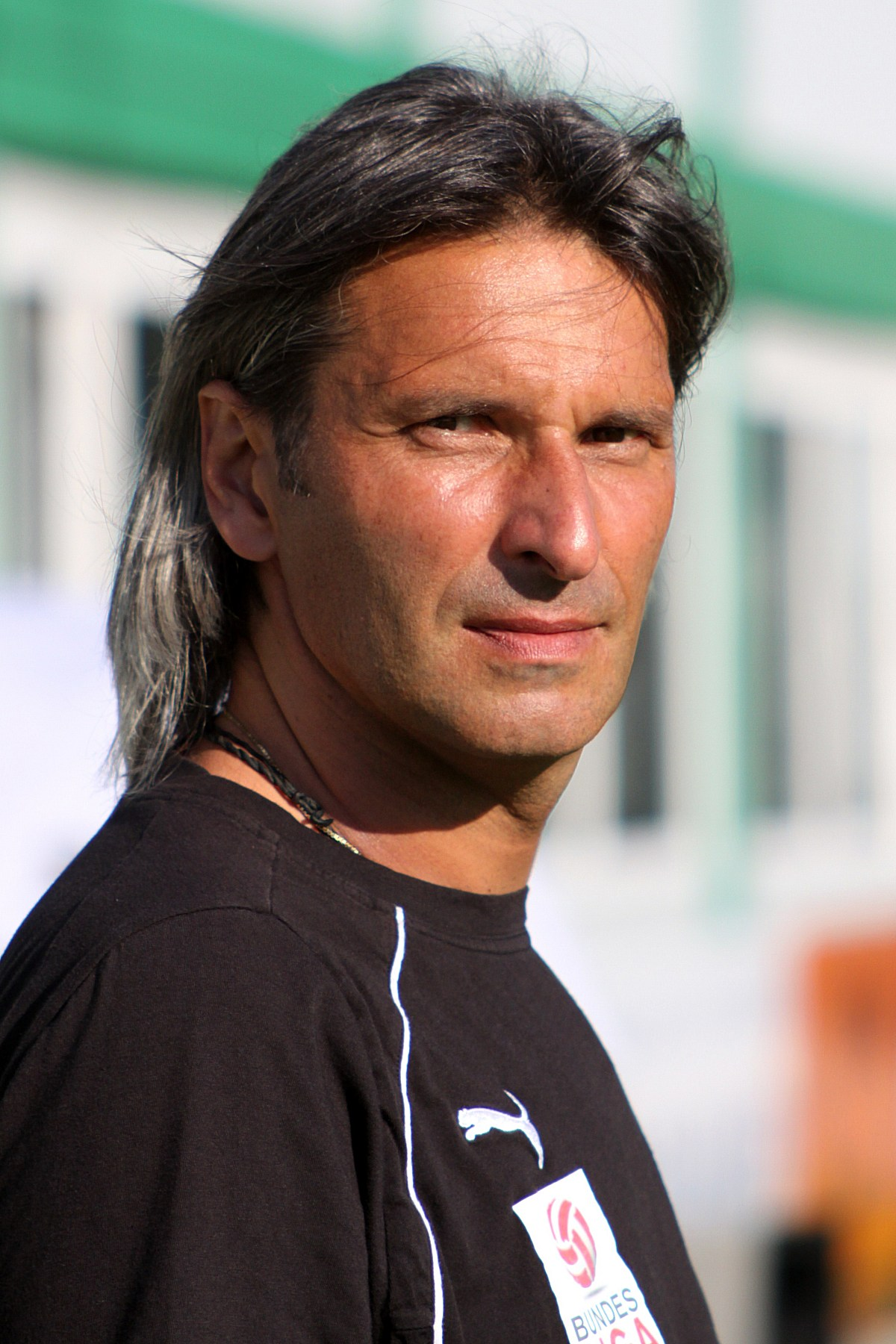
- Posch in 2011

Personal information
- Date of birth: 18 July 1967 (age 59)
- Place of birth: Bad Radkersburg, Austria
- Height: 1.85 m (6 ft 1 in)
- Position: Defender

Youth career
- TUS Mureck

Senior career*
Years	Team	Apps	(Gls)
1989–1991	SV Flavia Solva Wagna		
1991–1992	FC Swarovski Tirol	35	(5)
1992–1994	Bayer Uerdingen	20	(1)
1994–2000	Sturm Graz	130	(2)

International career
1992	Austria	2	(0)

Managerial career
- 2002–2005: Sturm Graz (reserves physio)
- 2006: SC Schwanenstadt
- 2006–2008: Sturm Graz (reserves athletic director)
- 2008: SK Schwadorf (assistant)
- 2008: Admira Wacker (assistant)
- * Club domestic league appearances and goals

Mario Posch (born 18 July 1967) is an Austrian football coach and a former defender.
