= Sladjan Pajić =

Austrian-Serbian footballer

Personal information
- Full name: Sladjan Pajić
- Date of birth: 28 March 1992 (age 34)
- Place of birth: Wien, Austria
- Height: 1.75 m (5 ft 9 in)
- Position: Midfielder

Youth career
- 2001–2004: Wiener Sportklub
- 2004–2006: First Vienna
- 2006–2008: Rapid Wien
- 2008: Stockerau
- 2008–2009: Wiener Sportklub
- 2009–2010: Würmla
- 2010: PSV Eindhoven

Senior career*
Years	Team	Apps	(Gls)
2009–2011	DAC Dunajská Streda	5	(0)
2011–2012	Admira Wacker Mödling II		
2013	SV Leobendorf		
2014	SC Lassee		
2016	ASKÖ Klingenbach		
2017	FC Angern		
2017	Mauerwerk S.A		
2018	Slovan Hütteldorfer		
- * Club domestic league appearances and goals as of 1 May 2012

Sladjan Pajić (born 28 March 1992) is an Austrian footballer of Serbian ethnicity who plays as a midfielder.
