= Christian Aflenzer =

German-born Austrian footballer (born 1972)

Personal information
- Date of birth: 31 March 1972 (age 54)
- Place of birth: Munich, West Germany
- Height: 1.78 m (5 ft 10 in)
- Position: Central midfielder

Team information
- Current team: SC Bad Sauerbrunn

Youth career
- Bayern Munich
- TSV 1860 Munich

Senior career*
Years	Team	Apps	(Gls)
1990–1991	Austria Salzburg		
1991–1992	Austria Klagenfurt		
1992–1994	Mérida UD	5	(?)
1994	Tirol Innsbruck	6	(0)
1995	Admira Dornbirn		
1995–1996	Dynamo Dresden	15	(?)
1996–1998	NK Istra	3	(0)
1998–2001	DSV Leoben	7	(0)
2001–2002	SV Mattersburg	3	(0)
2002–2003	LASK Linz	6	(1)
2003	SV Schwechat	1	(0)
2004	Wiener Sport-Club	1	(0)
2004–2006	SV Würmla	8	(0)
2006–2007	1. Wiener Neustädter SC		
2007–2008	SC Theresienfeld		
2008	SC Ortmann		
2009	SC Bad Sauerbrunn		
- ASK Eggendorf
- * Club domestic league appearances and goals

Christian Aflenzer (born 31 March 1972 in Munich) is a German-born Austrian football midfielder.

After initially playing for the youth teams of FC Bayern Munich and TSV 1860 München he began his senior career in Austria in 1990 with SV Austria Salzburg. He would go on to play for a number of other Austrian and foreign clubs, in chronological order: SV Austria Klagenfurt, Mérida UD (Spain), FC Tirol Innsbruck, Admira Dornbirn, Dynamo Dresden (Germany), NK Istra (Croatia, Prva HNL), DSV Leoben, SV Mattersburg, LASK Linz, SV Schwechat, Wiener Sport-Club, SV Würmla, 1. Wiener Neustädter SC, SC Theresienfeld, SC Ortmann and SC Bad Sauerbrunn.

While playing with 1. Wiener Neustädter SC and SV Würmla he was simultaneously a player and a coach.

== External sources ==
- Career at Tirol Innsbruck unofficial site
