= Christian Schandl =

Austrian footballer

Personal information
- Date of birth: 29 March 1978 (age 48)
- Place of birth: Vienna, Austria
- Position: Forward

Team information
- Current team: Wiener Sport-Club

Youth career
- Austria Wien

Senior career*
Years	Team	Apps	(Gls)
1994-1998	Austria Wien	0	(0)
1995-1998	→ Prater SV (loan)		
1998	Hearts	0	(0)
1999	Untersiebenbrunn	18+	(5+)
1999-2000	Gençlerbirliği	13	(2)
2000-2003	Untersiebenbrunn	84	(27)
2003-2005	Parndorf		
2006-2007	Schwadorf		
2007	→ SC Eisenstadt (loan)		
2007-2009	Wiener Sport-Club		
- * Club domestic league appearances and goals

Christian Schandl (born 29 March 1978) is an Austrian retired footballer who is last known to have played as a forward for Wiener Sport-Club.

== Career ==
Schandl started his career with Austrian top flight side Austria Wien. After that, he was sent on loan to Prater SV in the Austrian lower leagues. In 1998, Schandl signed for Hearts in the Scottish top flight. Before the second half of 1998–99, he signed for Austrian third division club Untersiebenbrunn, helping them earn promotion to the Austrian second division where he made 18 league appearances and scored 5 goals. On 13 July 1999, Schandl debuted for Untersiebenbrunm during a 1–1 draw with First Vienna FC. On 13 July 1999, he scored his first goal for Untersiebenbrunm during a 1–1 draw with First Vienna FC.

In 1999, Schandl signed for Gençlerbirliği in the Turkish top flight but left due to injury and homesickness. In 2003, he signed for Austrian third division team Parndorf after almost signing for Hannover 96 in the German second division. Before the second half of 2005/06, he signed for Austrian fourth division outfit Schwadorf, helping them earn promotion to the Austrian third division. After that, Schandl signed for Wiener Sport-Club in the Austrian third division.
