= Hungarian Football Federation =

Governing body of association football in Hungary

UEFA
- Short name: MLSZ
- Founded: 19 January 1901; 125 years ago
- Headquarters: Budapest
- FIFA affiliation: 1907
- UEFA affiliation: 15 June 1954; 72 years ago
- President: Sándor Csányi
- Website: mlsz.hu

The Hungarian Football Federation (HFF) (Hungarian: Magyar Labdarúgó Szövetség; MLSZ, pronounced [ˈmɒɟɒr ˈlɒbdɒruːɡoː ˈsøvɛt͡ʃːeːɡ]) is the governing body of football and futsal in Hungary. It organizes the Hungarian league and the Hungary national team. The MLSZ is responsible for the Hungarian football league system, the men's and women's national teams. The headquarters are in Budapest. The MLSZ is a member of the Hungarian Olympic Committee.

== Honours ==
National Team

- World Cup: Runner-up (2 times - 1938, 1954)
- Olympic Games: Winner (3 times - 1952, 1964, 1968); Runner-up (1 times - 1972); Third place (1 time - 1960)
- European Championship: (bronze) Third place (1): 1964

National Youth Teams

- FIFA U-20 World Cup: Third place (1): 2009

== Divisions ==
Men's

- Hungary national football team
- Hungary national under-21 football team
- Hungary national under-19 football team
- Hungary national under-17 football team
- Hungary national under-16 football team
- Hungary national futsal team
- Hungary national beach soccer team

Women's

- Hungary women's national football team
- Hungary women's national under-19 football team
- Hungary women's national under-17 football team

=== Current head coaches ===
As of 9 June 2025

Men's Team	Name
National team	(Italy) Marco Rossi
Under-21 team	(Hungary) Szabolcs Kemenes
Under-19 team	(Hungary) Gergő Jeremiás
Under-18 team	(Hungary) Szabolcs Kemenes
Under-17 team	(Hungary) Antal Németh
Under-16 team	(Hungary) Gergő Jeremiás
Under-15 team	(Hungary) László Szalai
Futsal team	(Spain) Sergio Mullor

Women's Team	Name
National team	(Hungary) Alexandra Szarvas
Under-19 team	(Hungary) László Makrai
Under-17 team	(Hungary) Tibor Gajdóczi

== Competitions ==
Magyar Labdarúgó Szövetség is responsible for organising the following competitions:

=== Men's football ===
- Nemzeti Bajnokság I (Tier 1)
- Nemzeti Bajnokság II (Tier 2)
- Nemzeti Bajnokság III (Tier 3) – three sections (East, Central, West)
- Megyei Bajnokság I (Tier 4) - nineteen sections (counties)

=== Women's football ===
- Nemzeti Bajnokság I (women) (Tier 1)
- Nemzeti Bajnokság II (women) (Tier 2) – two sections (East, West)

=== Cups ===
- Magyar Kupa – Men
- Magyar Kupa (women) – Women

=== Futsal ===
- Nemzeti Bajnokság I (Tier 1)
- Magyar Kupa – Men
- Nemzeti Bajnokság I (women) (Tier 1)
- Magyar Kupa (women) – Women

=== Beach soccer ===
- Nemzeti Strandlabdarúgó Liga (Tier 1)

== Hungarian Football Federation Player of the Year ==
As awarded by the HFF. In 1980 the title was not awarded. *In 1949, 1950 and 1963 the title was awarded to two players.

	Indicates multiple time winner
**Bold**	Indicates players still playing professional football

Year	Player	Club	Also won	Notes
1945	Sándor Balogh	(Hungary) Újpest		
1946	Ferenc Deák	(Hungary) Szentlőrinci AC		
1947	Ferenc Szusza	(Hungary) Újpest		
1948	Adalbert Marksteiner	(Hungary) Csepel SC		
1949	Mihály Kispéter	(Hungary) Ferencvárosi		
1949	Gyula Grosics	(Hungary) Teherfuvar		
1950	Ferenc Puskás	(Hungary) Budapest Honvéd		
1950	Gyula Grosics	(Hungary) Budapest Honvéd		
1951	Péter Palotás	(Hungary) MTK Budapest		
1952	József Bozsik	(Hungary) Budapest Honvéd		
1953	Nándor Hidegkuti	(Hungary) MTK Budapest		
1954	Sándor Kocsis	(Hungary) Budapest Honvéd		

== Hungarian Footballer of the Year (Golden Ball) ==
As awarded by journalists

- 2012: Ádám Szalai
- 2013: Szabolcs Huszti
- 2017: Nemanja Nikolić
- 2019: Péter Gulácsi
- 2020: Dominik Szoboszlai
- 2021: András Schäfer
- 2022: Dominik Szoboszlai
- 2023: Dominik Szoboszlai
- 2024: Dominik Szoboszlai
- 2025: Dominik Szoboszlai

== Presidents ==
- Géza Jász (1901–1902)
- Viktor Rákosi (1902)
- Kajetán Banovits (1903–1906)
- Béla Kárpáti (1907–1909)
- György Szacelláry (1909–1916)
- Marquis György Pallavicini (1916)
- Zoltán Füzesséry dr. (1917–1919)
- Rezső Oprée (1919–1922)
- István Friedrich (1922–1923)
- Kálmán Shvoy dr. (1924)
- József Csányi dr., Lajos Tibor (1925)
- Dréhr Imre (1925–1930)
- István Kray baron (1930–1932)
- Béla Usetty dr. (1932–1939)
- Pál Gidófalvy dr. (1939–1944)
- József Becskó (1945–1947)
- István Ries dr. (1947–1950)
- Sándor Barcs (1950–1963)
- Gyula Hegyi (1964–1970)
- András Terpitkó dr. (1970–1973)
- István Kutas (1974–1978)
- György Szepesi (1979–1986)
- Jenő Somogyi (1986–1988)
- László Tisza dr., Tibor Vadászi, Miklós Varga dr. (1988–1989)
- Mihály Laczkó (1989–1994)
- László Benkő (1994–1996)
- Mihály Laczkó (2x) (1996–1998)
- Attila Kovács (1998–1999)
- Imre Bozsóki dr. (1999–2006)
- István Kisteleki (2006–2010)
- Sándor Csányi (2010– )

== Current sponsorships ==
- Adidas - Official main sponsor
- One Hungary - Official main sponsor
- OTP Bank - Official main sponsor
- TippMix - Official main sponsor
- WizzAir - Official main sponsor
- McDonald's - Official sponsor
- Borsodi - Official sponsor

== See also ==
- Hungarian football league system
- List of football clubs in Hungary
