= Maťovské Vojkovce =

Village and municipality in Slovakia

Maťovské Vojkovce Mátyócvajkóc
- Municipality
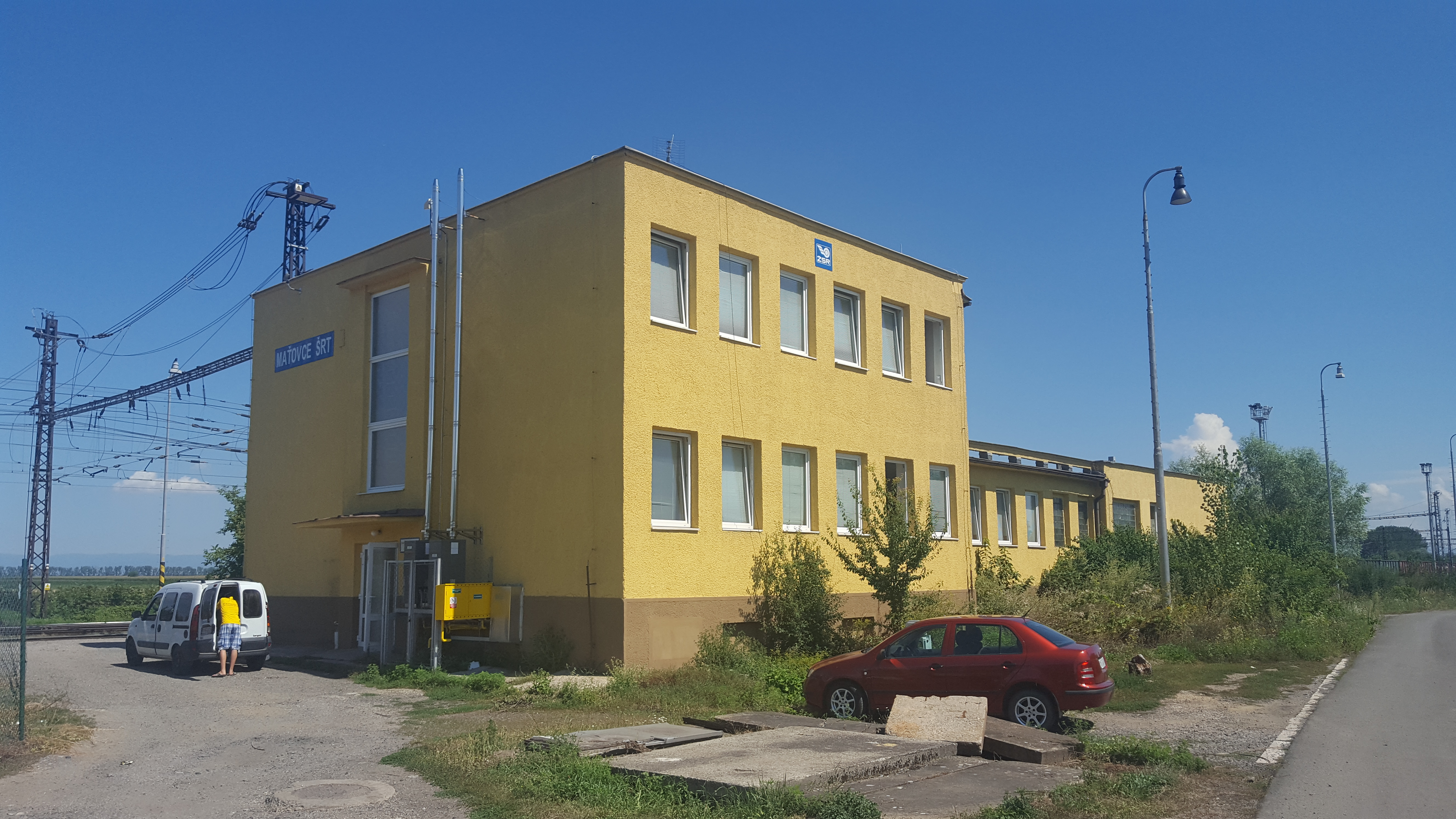

- Flag

- Location of Maťovské Vojkovce in the Košice Region Location of Maťovské Vojkovce in Slovakia
- Coordinates: 48.57°N 22.14°E
- Country: Slovakia
- Region: Košice Region
- District: Michalovce District
- First mentioned: 1302

Area
  - Total: 12.29 km^{2} (4.75 sq mi)
- Elevation: 106 m (348 ft)

Population (2025)
  - Total: 694
- Time zone: UTC+1 (CET)
  - Summer (DST): UTC+2 (CEST)
- Postal code: 790 1
- Area code: +421 56
- Vehicle registration plate (until 2022): MI
- Website: www.matovskevojkovce.sk

Maťovské Vojkovce (Slovak pronunciation: [ˈmacɔwskeː ˈʋɔjkɔwtse]; Hungarian: Mátyócvajkóc) is a village and municipality in Michalovce District in the Košice Region of eastern Slovakia. Mayor of the village is Lýdia Czapová

== History ==
In historical records the village was first mentioned in 1302. In the village coat of arms, the dog faithfully guards its owner, the shepherd with a stick, but it is also possible that the shepherd ordered the animal to his feet. Maťovce's name was originally Porchal (1279), then Matyuch-Porchal (Zigeth). It was first mentioned under its current name in 1427. The village belonged to the domain of the Ungvár castle. From 1401, it was owned by the Perényis, in 1425 by the Csicseri family, and then in the next few years, there were frequent changes of ownership. In 1472, the Lelesz convent, and then in 1478, by royal decree, László Básti was installed as part owner. Its population adopted the Reformed faith in the 17th century, a house of worship and a parsonage were built. These were later destroyed during the Counter-Reformation. In the 19th century, the local estates belonged to the Felföldy and Polányi families. In the 19th century, it was inhabited by Hungarians and Ruthenians. From the end of the 19th century, many of its inhabitants emigrated to America. At the end of the 19th century, the Mátyóci Társaság was formed for drainage works in the area. In 1910, the Ungvár-Vaján railway line was built, one of whose stations was Maťovce. Vojkovce first appeared in written sources in 1338 in the form Weychkocsh. Its population adopted the Reformed faith in the 17th century, and its first Reformed church was built in the 18th century. Until 1920, both villages belonged to the Nagykaposi district of Ung County. Between 1938-45, they were reattached to Hungary. In 1944, their Jewish residents (28 people in 1938) were dragged to a concentration camp. In 1945, when the new Soviet-Czechoslovak border was drawn, it became a border village. In 1964, Maťovce and Vojkovce were united under the name Mátyóvcajkóc (Maťovské Vojkovce). In 1966, the broad-gauge Ungvár-Enyicke railway line was built to transport iron ore to the Kasa ironworks, which arrived in Czechoslovakia here. At that time, a railway transshipment area was established at the border of Mátyócvajkóc.

== Geography ==
The municipality lies at an altitude of 106 metres (348 ft) and covers an area of 12.29 km^{2} (4.75 sq mi) (2025).

== Population ==
Population statistic (10 years)
Year	1995	2005	2015	2025
Count	534	598	615	694
Difference		+11.98%	+2.84%	+12.84%

Population statistic
Year	2024	2025
Count	702	694
Difference		−1.13%

It has a population of 694 people (31 December 2025).

=== Ethnicity ===
Census 2021 (1+ %)
Ethnicity	Number	Fraction
Hungarian	541	76.73%
Slovak	130	18.43%
Not found out	62	8.79%
Romani	12	1.7%
Total	705	

In year 2021 was 705 people by ethnicity 541 as Hungarian, 130 as Slovak, 62 as Not found out, 12 as Romani, 3 as Ukrainian, 3 as Polish and 2 as Other.

Note on population: The difference values of population numbers in the table "Population statistic" and in the sections "Ethnicity" & "Religion" is caused by the use of various statistical methods.

=== Religion ===
Census 2021 (1+ %)
Religion	Number	Fraction
Roman Catholic Church	293	41.56%
Greek Catholic Church	230	32.62%
Not found out	79	11.21%
Calvinist Church	69	9.79%
None	24	3.4%
Total	705	

In year 2021 was 705 people by religion 293 from Roman Catholic Church, 230 from Greek Catholic Church, 79 from Not found out, 69 from Calvinist Church, 24 from None, 3 from Jehovah's Witnesses, 3 from Evangelical Church, 2 from Christian Congregations in Slovakia, 1 from Other and 1 from Apostolic Church. Average age for person is 38.75 years. The population density is 56.45 people per km2. Majority of the people are Hungarian.

== See also ==
- List of municipalities and towns in Michalovce District
- List of municipalities and towns in Slovakia
