= Heiko Laeßig =

German footballer

Personal information
- Date of birth: 18 June 1968 (age 58)
- Place of birth: Magdeburg, East Germany
- Height: 1.83 m (6 ft 0 in)
- Position: Defender

Senior career*
Years	Team	Apps	(Gls)
1986–1991	1. FC Magdeburg	58	(17)
1991–1996	KFC Uerdingen 05	145	(32)
1996–2005	SV Austria Salzburg	268	(43)
Total		471	(92)
- * Club domestic league appearances and goals

Heiko Laeßig (born 18 June 1968) is a German former professional footballer who played as a defender.
