= Skelley Adu Tutu =

Ghanaian footballer

Personal information
- Full name: Skelley Adu Tutu
- Date of birth: August 10, 1979 (age 47)
- Place of birth: Kumasi, Ghana
- Height: 1.80 m (5 ft 11 in)
- Position: Striker

Team information
- Current team: USV Hollenegg (Austria)
- Number: 17

Senior career*
Years	Team	Apps	(Gls)
1995–1996	King Faisal Babes		
1997–1999	R. Union Saint-Gilloise	15	(2)
1999–2003	Grazer AK	83	(11)
2003–2004	Kapfenberger SV	9	(3)
2004	King Faisal Babes		
2004	Saba Battery		
2005–2006	LASK Linz	4	(0)
2006–2007	Hasaacas Sekondi		
2007–2011	Hapoel Beer Sheva		
2011–	USV Hollenegg	7	(5)

International career^{‡}
1999	Ghana U20	5	(0)
2000	Ghana	2	(0)
- * Club domestic league appearances and goals as of 14 September 2007 ‡ National team caps and goals as of 14 September 2007

Skelley Adu Tutu (born August 10, 1979, in Kumasi) is a Ghanaian football striker.

== International career ==
Adu Tutu represented the Ghana national under-20 football team in the 1999 FIFA World Youth Championship.
