= Christian Banovits =

Austrian football defender

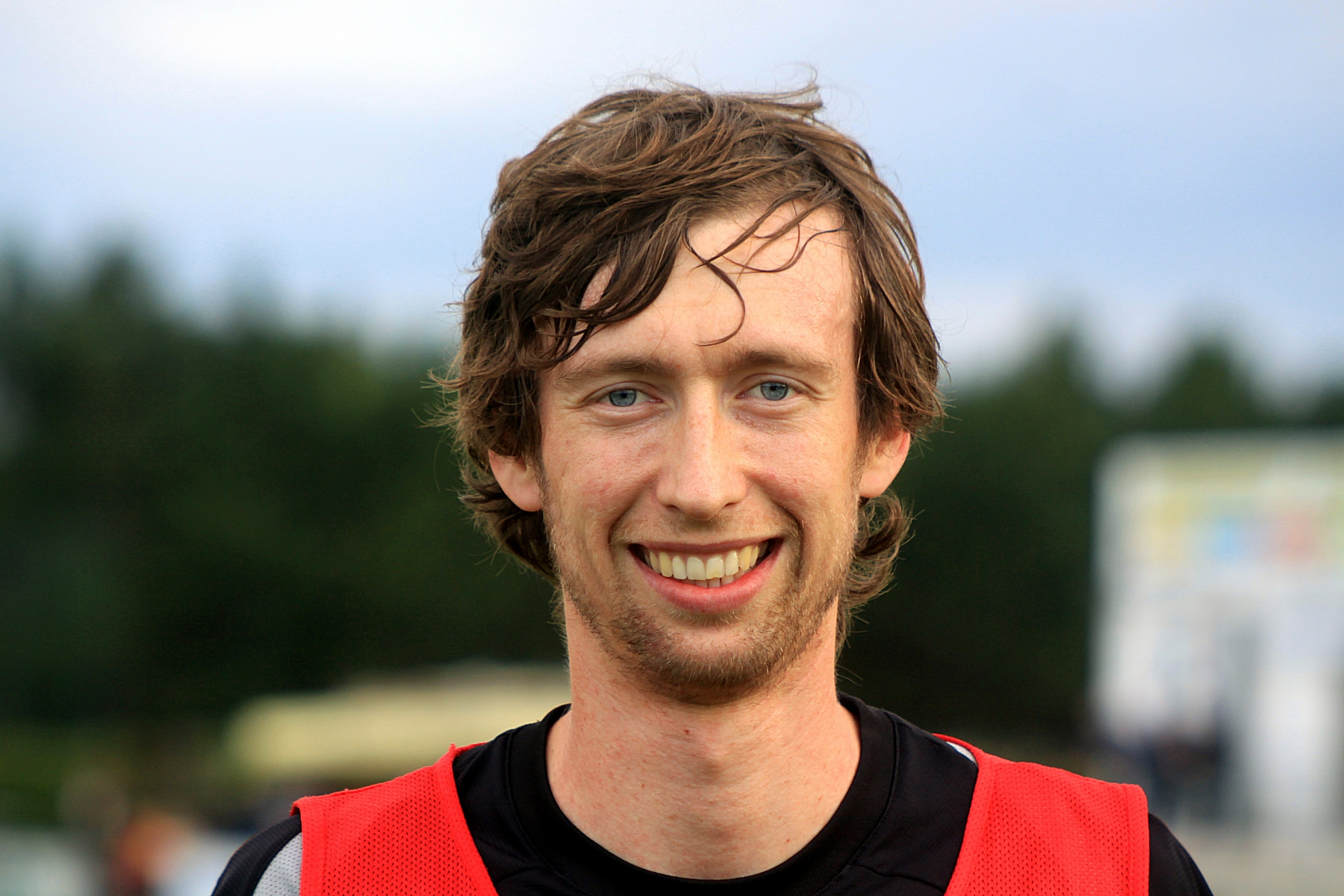

Personal information
- Date of birth: 28 October 1981 (age 45)
- Place of birth: Austria
- Height: 1.90 m (6 ft 3 in)
- Position: Defender

Team information
- Current team: 1. SC Sollenau
- Number: 3

Senior career*
Years	Team	Apps	(Gls)
2000–2005	Admira Wacker	30	(0)
2003	→ Lombard-Pápa TFC (loan)	0	(0)
2004	→ Győri ETO FC (loan)	0	(0)
2005	→ Szombathelyi Haladás (loan)	0	(0)
2005–2006	First Vienna FC	15	(0)
2006–2007	Admira Wacker	16	(1)
2007–2008	Admira Wacker II	21	(1)
2008	Admira Wacker	0	(0)
2008–2010	SV Würmla	28	(3)
2010–	1. SC Sollenau		

International career
2002	Austria U-21		
- * Club domestic league appearances and goals

Christian Banovits (born 28 October 1981) is an Austrian football defender. He currently plays for 1. SC Sollenau.
