= Attila Sekerlioglu =

Austrian footballer (born 1965)

Personal information
- Date of birth: 27 January 1965 (age 61)
- Place of birth: Vienna, Austria
- Height: 1.85 m (6 ft 1 in)
- Positions: Defender; midfielder

Youth career
- Elektra Vienna

Senior career*
Years	Team	Apps	(Gls)
1985–1987	Austria Wien	0	(0)
1988–1995	Austria Wien	173	(7)
1995	FC Tirol Innsbruck	16	(0)
1995–1998	St Johnstone	41	(7)
1998–2001	SC Untersiebenbrunn		
2001–2002	FC Oslip		

Managerial career
- 2002–2003: Maccabi Vienna
- 2003–2004: SC Himberg
- 2005: SV Horn
- 2005–2007: ASK Schwadorf
- 2008: VfB Admira Wacker Mödling
- 2009: Tema Youth
- 2010: Berekum Chelsea
- 2011–2012: SV Stockerau
- * Club domestic league appearances and goals

Attila Sekerlioglu (born 27 January 1965) is an Austrian former professional footballer who played as a midfielder. After retiring, he moved into management. He has most recently been manager of Austrian club SV Stockerau. He is now a scout for Bayern Munich.

== Club career ==
During his career he played for Elektra Vienna, Austria Vienna (1988–1995), VSE St. Pölten, FC Tirol Innsbruck (1995), St Johnstone (1995–1998), SC Untersiebenbrunn and FC Oslip.

== Coaching career ==
Since retirement, he has moved into coaching and management, in the early 2000s, Sekerlioglu managed Maccabi Vienna, SC Himberg and, until January 2005, SV Horn. Sekerlioglu was appointed manager of ASK Schwadorf, then in the Austrian Regionalliga (Austrian third-tier), in 2005. Schwadorf hosted English giants Arsenal in a pre-season friendly on 31 July 2006. The visitors won 8–1.

Sekerlioglu guided ASK Schwadorf to the championship Austrian Regionalliga East in 2006–07, thus seeing the club promoted for the fifth time in six years, after winning 22 of their 30 league games, but he was fired in August 2007 after the club failed to win their first two games of the 2007–08 season.

He went on to manage VfB Admira Wacker Mödling during the 2007–08 season, but was dismissed in April 2008. He signed for Ghanaian Premier League side Tema Youth in early 2009, but left at the end of the season. He remained in Ghana to become manager of Berekum Chelsea in October 2010.

On 22 August 2011, he was named as head coach of the Austrian Landesliga side SV Stockerau, before leaving the following year to take up his current role with Bayern Munich.

In November 2014, it was reported that he is one of the coaches who applied for India U17 job to manage in 2017 FIFA U-17 World Cup.

== Personal life ==
Sekerlioglu of Turkish descent.

His brother, Cem, was also a footballer. He has a son.

== Honours ==
=== As a player ===
Austria Wien

- Austrian Football Bundesliga: 1991, 1992, 1993
- Austrian Cup: 1990, 1992, 1994

=== As a manager ===
ASK Schwadorf

- Austrian Regionalliga East: 2007
