= Metin Aslan =

Austrian footballer

Personal information
- Full name: Metin Aslan
- Date of birth: 4 March 1978 (age 48)
- Place of birth: Linz, Austria
- Height: 1.85 m (6 ft 1 in)
- Position: Defender

Team information
- Current team: Orduspor

Youth career
- ATSV Sankt Martin bei Traun

Senior career*
Years	Team	Apps	(Gls)
1998–2000	SV Pasching		
2000–2001	BSV Bad Bleiberg		
2001–2003	SV Pasching	32	(1)
2003–2004	Manisaspor	23	(1)
2006–2010	Antalyaspor	48	(1)
2010–2011	Alanyaspor	19	(0)
- * Club domestic league appearances and goals as of 15 June 2008

Metin Aslan (born 4 March 1978) is an Austrian former professional footballer. He last played for SC St. Valentin.

== Club career ==
Born in Austria, Aslan made his professional debut with SV Pasching and won the Erste Liga in 2002 to gain promotion to Austria's top league. He then moved to Turkey to play for the second division side Manisaspor, and in 2006, signed with Antalyaspor. Aslan made his debut for Antalyaspor in a match on 6 August 2006 against Çaykur Rizespor, where he came on as a 70th-minute substitute for Levent Kartop.
