= Jürgen Halper =

Austrian footballer and manager

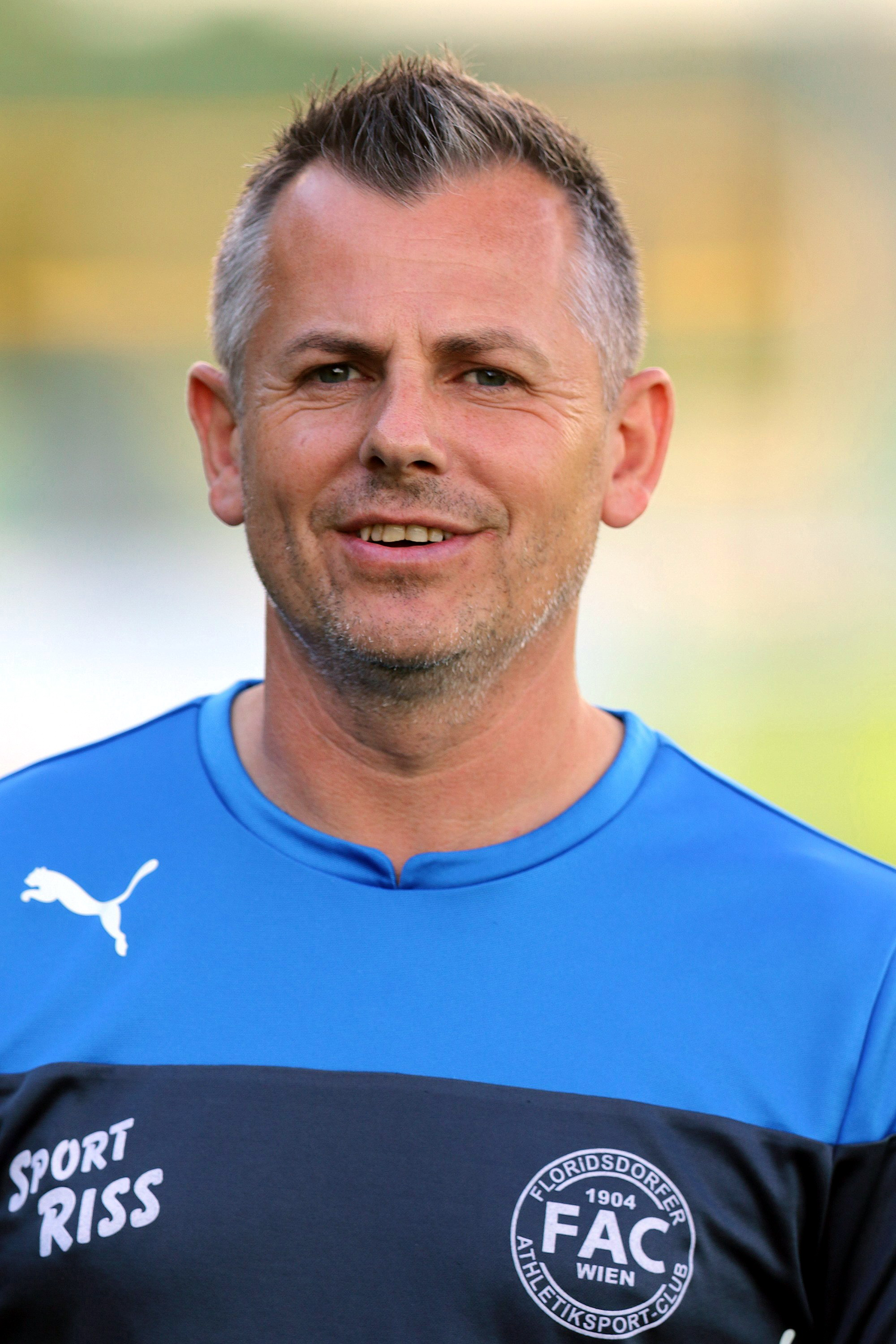

Personal information
- Date of birth: 17 November 1974 (age 51)
- Place of birth: Austria
- Height: 1.70 m (5 ft 7 in)
- Position: Midfielder

Team information
- Current team: Neusiedl am See (Head coach)

Youth career
- –1992: AKA Burgenland U18

Senior career*
Years	Team	Apps	(Gls)
1992–1993	ASKÖ Rotenturm		
1993–1997	SV Oberwart	25	(3)
1997	Admira Wacker	10	(0)
1997–1998	TSV Hartberg	26	(3)
1998–1999	FC Braunau	21	(1)
1999–2000	SV Oberwart	7	(1)
2000–2002	SC Eisenstadt	51	(9)
2002–2003	SV Hundsheim	12	(2)
2003–2004	Floridsdorfer AC	21	(2)
2004–2005	DSV Fortuna 05 Wien	6	(1)
2005	ASK Kohfidisch		
2005–2006	SC/ESV Parndorf II		
2006	ASKÖ Rotenturm		
2006–2007	FC Deutschkreutz		
2007–2013	SV Stuben		
2013	ASKÖ Rotenturm		
2013–2014	SV Neuberg		

Managerial career
- 2007–2012: SV Stuben (player-manager)
- 2013–2014: SV Neuberg
- 2014: SV Oberwart
- 2014–2015: Floridsdorfer AC (assistant)
- 2016: Floridsdorfer AC
- 2017–2019: SV Oberwart
- 2021–: Neusiedl am See
- * Club domestic league appearances and goals

Jürgen Halper (born 17 November 1974) is an Austrian football manager, currently in charge of SC Neusiedl am See 1919.
