= Béla Kárpáti =

Hungarian footballer (1929–2003)

Personal information
- Date of birth: 30 September 1929
- Place of birth: Felsőgalla, Hungary
- Date of death: 31 December 2003 (aged 74)
- Place of death: Budapest, Hungary
- Position: Defender

Senior career*
| Years | Team | Apps | (Gls) |
| 1946–1955 | Győri ETO FC | 161 | (0) |
| 1956–1964 | Vasas SC | 125 | (0) |
| Total | | 286 | (0) |

International career
| 1953–1958 | Hungary | 19 | (0) |
Medal record
Representing Hungary
FIFA World Cup
| Runner-up | 1954 Switzerland |
- * Club domestic league appearances and goals

Béla Kárpáti (30 September 1929 – 31 December 2003) was a Hungarian football defender who played for Hungary in the 1954 and 1958 FIFA World Cups. He also played for Győri ETO FC and Vasas SC.
