= Harold Meyssen =

Belgian footballer

Personal information
- Full name: Harold Meyssen
- Date of birth: 24 July 1971 (age 55)
- Place of birth: Maaseik, Belgium
- Position: Midfielder

Team information
- Current team: Mol-Wezel

Youth career
- Stokkem
- FC Liège

Senior career*
Years	Team	Apps	(Gls)
1988–1993	SK Tongeren	64	(5)
1991–1992	→ Sint-Truiden	25	(4)
1993–1999	Eendracht Aalst	163	(38)
1999–2000	SV Casino Salzburg	13	(1)
2000–2003	Standard Liège	81	(7)
2003–2006	Cercle Brugge	83	(6)
2006–2008	KV Oostende	51	(4)
2008–	Mol-Wezel	22	(5)

International career^{‡}
	Belgium	0	(0)
- * Club domestic league appearances and goals as of 1 July 2009 ‡ National team caps and goals as of 4 February 2008

Harold Meyssen (born 24 July 1971 in Maaseik) is a Belgian professional football player. Meyssen is a left-footed midfielder with an excellent technique.

Meyssen started playing football with his local team Stokkem, but was discovered there by First division side FC Liège. Not achieving a breakthrough there, he signed for SK Tongeren, playing in second division. It would eventually be with Eendracht Aalst that Meyssen promoted to the Jupiler League. Meyssen would stay there for 6 seasons.

He then went to Austrian side SV Casino Salzburg, where he would stay for only one season. He returned to Belgium, signing for Standard Liège, the biggest club in Meyssen's career. After 3 seasons, Meyssen's role was played out, and he then chose the newly promoted Cercle Brugge to continue his career.

Meyssen is currently seeing out his career with Belgian coast team KV Oostende.
