= Enrico Kulovits =

Austrian footballer and manager

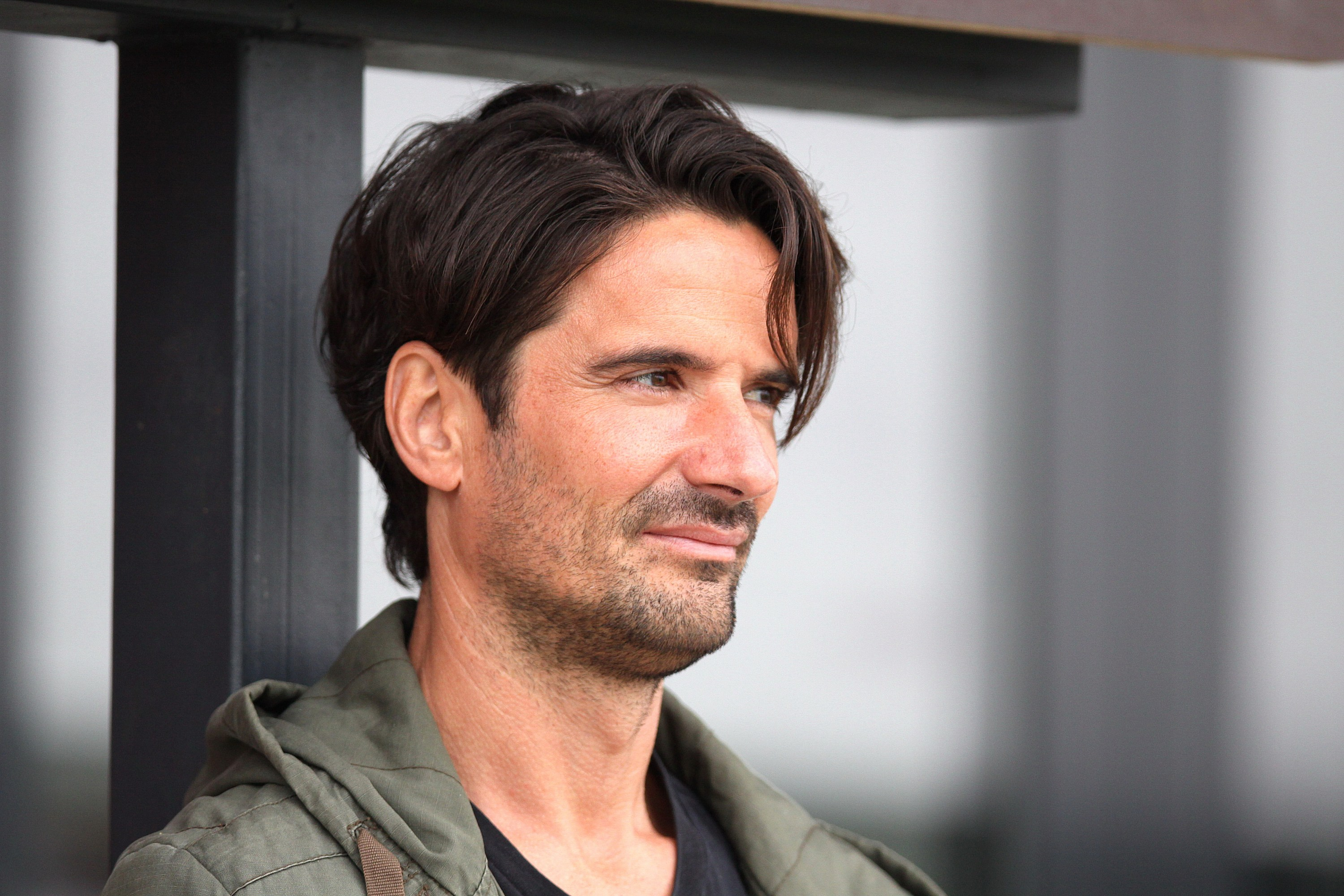

Personal information
- Date of birth: 29 December 1974 (age 51)
- Place of birth: Güttenbach, Austria
- Height: 1.80 m (5 ft 11 in)
- Position: Midfielder

Senior career*
Years	Team	Apps	(Gls)
1993–1995	SV Oberwart	4	(0)
1995–2004	Grazer AK	146	(10)
2003	→ SC Bregenz (loan)	30	(0)
2004	Skoda Xanthi	12	(0)
2004–2005	Admira Wacker	24	(0)
2005–2006	SV Mattersburg	19	(0)
2006–2008	FC Lustenau 07	47	(0)
2008–2009	Grazer AK II		
2009–2010	SK Werndorf		
2010–2011	SV Güttenbach		

Managerial career
- 2008–2009: Grazer AK (assistant)
- 2009–2012: SK Werndorf
- 2012–: USV Allerheiligen
- 2012–2013: SV Eltendorf
- 2016–2018: USV Mettersdorf
- 2018: SC Kalsdorf
- 2018–2019: Grazer AK
- 2019–: AKA Burgenland U18
- * Club domestic league appearances and goals

Enrico Kulovits (born 29 December 1974) is an Austrian football manager and former player who manages AKA Burgenland U18.
