= SK Schwadorf =

Defunct Austrian football club

- Full name: Trenkwalder Sportklub Schwadorf
- Founded: 31 May 1936
- Dissolved: August 2008
- Ground: Richard-Gebert-Sportanlage; Schwadorf, Austria
- Capacity: 5,000
Home colours

Sportklub Schwadorf (more commonly known as SK Schwadorf) was an Austrian football club, based in Schwadorf. They were last playing in the First League. The club was known as Trenkwalder Sportklub Schwadorf for sponsorship reasons — Trenkwalder being the company of chairman Richard Trenkwalder. In 2008, the club merged with VfB Admira Wacker Mödling to become Trenkwalder Admira.

== History ==
The club was founded as ASK Schwadorf in May 1936, and played its first game on 7 June of that year, against Fischamend, winning 4–3.

The club's logo during its life as ASK Schwadorf.

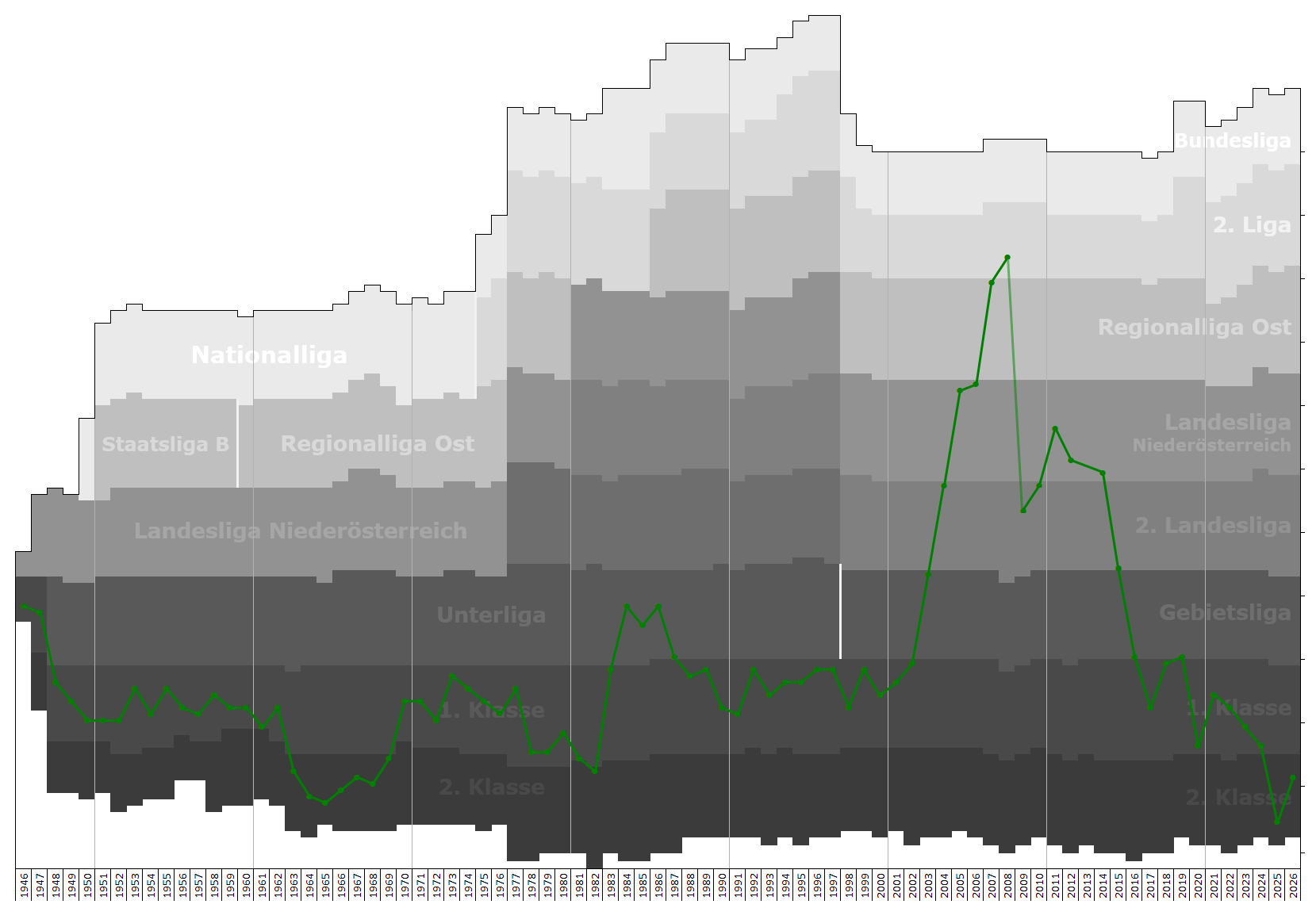
Historical chart of league performance

On 8 August 2005, ASK Schwadorf hosted Spanish club Real Madrid in a pre-season friendly. The visitors fielded a team that included former FIFA World Player of the Year, Zinedine Zidane, Raúl, David Beckham and Michael Owen, Ronaldo and Roberto Carlos. Real won 4–1, with the goals coming from Raúl, Ronaldo, Javier Portillo and Owen.

Similarly, the club welcomed English Premier League side Arsenal for a pre-season friendly on 31 July 2006. The visitors, whose line-up featured only a couple of familiar names, won 8–1.

The club won the Landesliga championship in 2005–06 by a margin of twelve points.

They went on to win the Austrian Regional League East in 2006–07, thus achieving promotion for the fifth time in six years. Of their 30 league games, they won 22, drew 6, and lost 2. They finished seven points ahead of second-placed Polizei Feuerwehr.

Between 2005 and 2007, their manager was Attila Sekerlioglu. Sekerlioglu was fired in August 2007, and replaced by Bernd Krauss.

Prior to the 2007–08 season, the club changed its name from ASK Schwadorf to SK Schwadorf. The following season, 2008–09, Richard Trenkwalder bought the team, relocated it to Südstadt, and merged it with VfB Admira Wacker Mödling to become Trenkwalder Admira. For the 2013–14 season they are playing in the Austrian Football Bundesliga.

== Former coaches ==
- Georg Heu
- Vladimir Jugović
- Bernd Krauss
- Heinz Peischl
- Mario Posch
- Andreas Ogris
- Attila Sekerlioglu
- Franz Wohlfahrt

== Records ==
The club's biggest victory took place on 22 April 1983, when they beat ASK Edelsthal 10–0. Their reserve team, ASK Schwadorf II, won 19–0 on the same day.
