= SV Würmla =

Austrian association football club

- Full name: Sportverein Würmla
- Founded: 1969
- Ground: Sportanlage
- Capacity: 1500
- League: Austrian 2. Landesliga
Home colours	Away colours

SV Würmla are an Austrian association football club founded in 1969 and playing in the 5th tier Lower Austria 2. Landesliga West during 2020/2021 season.

The club's biggest success to date was reaching the 2nd round of the 1998–99 Austrian Cup, losing 3–2 after extra time to FC Waidhofen/Ybbs.

== Honours ==
- Austrian Cup: 2nd round 1998–99
- Landesliga Niederösterreich: Champions 2003–04

== Current squad ==
Note: Flags indicate national team as defined under FIFA eligibility rules; some limited exceptions apply. Players may hold more than one non-FIFA nationality.

No.	Pos.	Nation	Player
1	GK	AUT	Michael Kerschbaumer
25	GK	AUT	Zeljko Milosevic
2	DF	SRB	Dejan Dimić
3	DF	AUT	Christian Banovits
4	DF	AUT	Markus Tscharnig
6	DF	AUT	Rene Weiss
18	DF	AUT	David Feiner
19	DF	AUT	Levent Acar
5	MF	SRB	Denis Hadžić
7	MF	SRB	Marijan Popa
8	MF	AUT	Daniel Nikić

No.	Pos.	Nation	Player
11	MF	AUT	Mark Langstadlinger
12	MF	AUT	Markus Kerschner
13	MF	AUT	Joachim Hirzi
15	MF	AUT	Andreas Eder
16	MF	AUT	Christian Eder
20	MF	AUT	Lukas Marschall
21	MF	SRB	Sladjan Pajić
9	FW	POL	Daniel Dylewski
10	FW	AUT	Benedict Bauer
14	FW	AUT	Heribert Fruhauf
17	FW	SRB	Nenad Panić

== Staff ==
- Trainer: (Austria) Maumer Dedic
- Co-Trainer: (Austria) Perry Krakowitsch
- Goalkeeper coach: (Austria) Wolfagang Bauer
- Physio: (Austria) Cladio Haaser
