= Breitenfurt bei Wien =

Breitenfurt bei Wien Braadnfuat bei Wean
- Municipality
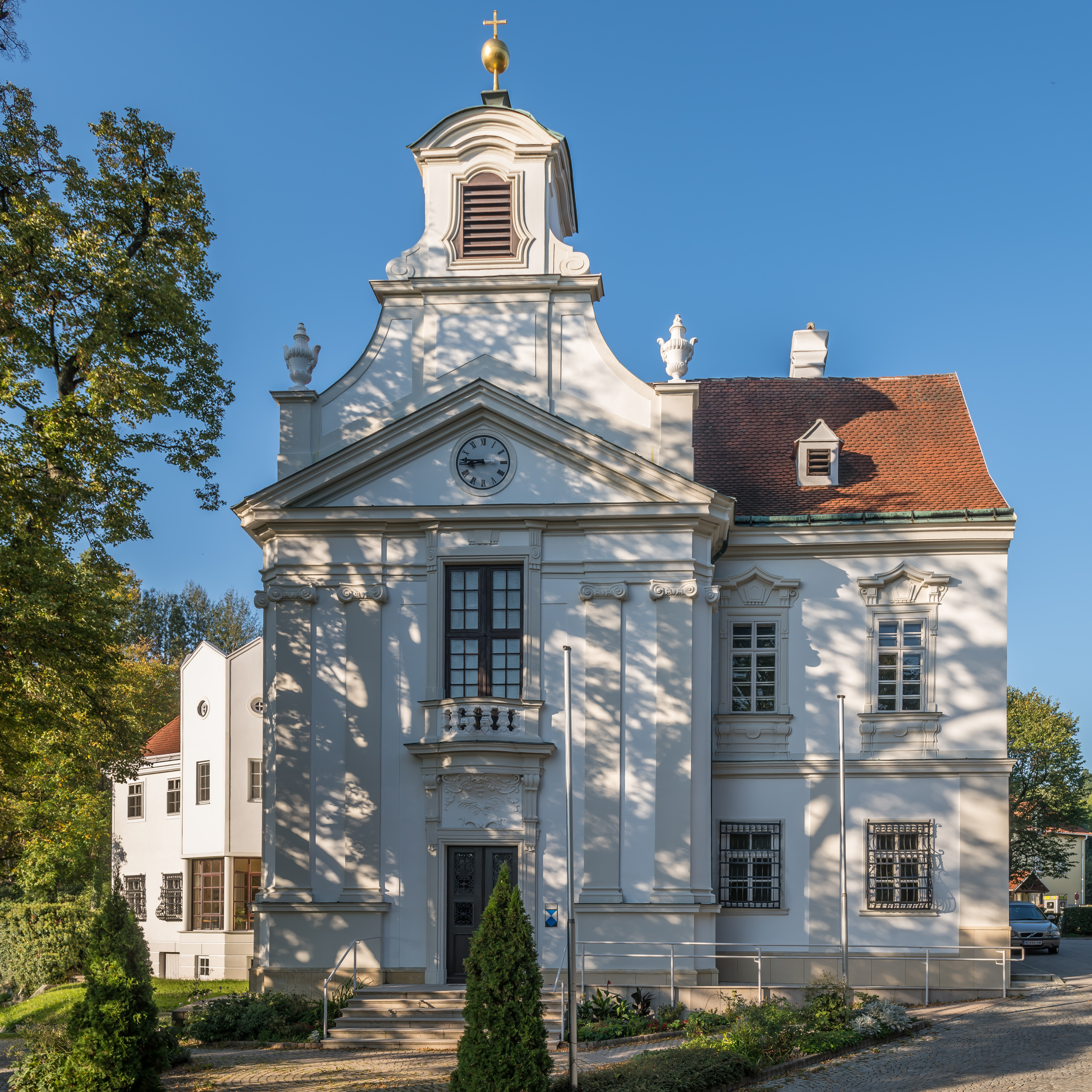

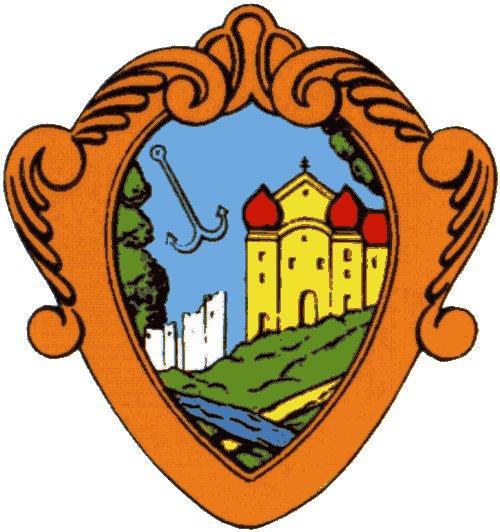
- Coat of arms

- Location within Austria
- Coordinates: 48°8′N 16°9′E
- Country: Austria
- State: Lower Austria
- District: Mödling

Government
  - Mayor: Ernst Morgenbesser

Area
  - Total: 27 km^{2} (10 sq mi)
- Elevation: 295 m (968 ft)

Population (2018-01-01)
  - Total: 5,853
  - Density: 220/km^{2} (560/sq mi)
- Time zone: UTC+1 (CET)
  - Summer (DST): UTC+2 (CEST)
- Postal code: 2384
- Area code: 02239
- Website: www.gemeinde-breitenfurt.at

Breitenfurt bei Wien (Central Bavarian: Braadnfuat bei Wean) is a town in the district of Mödling in the Austrian state of Lower Austria.

== Geography ==
Breitenfurt lies in the Vienna woods directly abutting the city of Vienna on the southwest in the valley of the Liesing. The municipality is one of the largest in the area and has a population density of 197/km^{2}. The municipality has large elevation changes and lies between 260 and 592 meters above sea level.

The municipality consists of two parts: Breitenfurt and Hochroterd. Breitenfurt-Ostende lies next to Wien-Kalksburg. From Breitenfurt, the road leads over the Kleinen Semmering to Wolfsgraben.

=== Neighboring municipalities ===
Breitenfut lies on the district boundary between Mödling and Wien-Umgebung next to Wolfsgraben. The other neighboring municipalities are Laab im Walde, Wienerwald, and Kaltenleutgeben, all in the district of Mödling.

== History ==
Breitenfurt was founded relatively late and first appears in historical records in 1622 as an inhabited place. Until then, the name Breitenfurt was used only to designate a rural area. Until the Turkish invasion in 1683, a royal hunting lodge was located there, and the ruins of that lodge appear on the coat of arms of the municipality. After the Turkish occupation, there were 20 houses still standing in Breitenfurt. The area was soon settled with people from Salzburg, Bavaria, and Steiermark. The inhabitants were mostly woodworkers. In 1721, there were already 42 houses in town and 32 houses in outlying areas of the municipality. From 1714 to 1732, Gregor Wilhelm von Kirchner, a banking magnate, built a baroque palace in the area, but it was torn down by 1796. The present parish church was originally the chapel of this palace.

Breitenfurt became an independent municipality in 1848 and elected its first mayor in 1850. It became a beloved resort of Vienna residents, and the tourist industry flourished. In 1898, an electric train line was proposed to bring holiday-makers from Vienna, but this project never materialized.

Due to the steady population growth, Breitenfurt became a market town in 1930. In 1938, the municipality was incorporated into the city of Vienna, as were many others in the area, and became the 25th district of Greater Vienna. It became an independent municipality again in 1954.

== Population ==
Historical population

| Year | Pop. | ±% |
|---|---|---|
| 1869 | 751 | — |
| 1880 | 892 | +18.8% |
| 1890 | 858 | −3.8% |
| 1900 | 928 | +8.2% |
| 1910 | 961 | +3.6% |
| 1923 | 967 | +0.6% |
| 1934 | 1,431 | +48.0% |
| 1939 | 1,586 | +10.8% |

| Year | Pop. | ±% |
|---|---|---|
| 1951 | 1,624 | +2.4% |
| 1961 | 1,835 | +13.0% |
| 1971 | 2,795 | +52.3% |
| 1981 | 3,641 | +30.3% |
| 1991 | 4,777 | +31.2% |
| 2001 | 5,323 | +11.4% |
| 2011 | 5,809 | +9.1% |
