= Wiener Neudorf =

Wiener Neudorf Weana Neiduaf
- Municipality
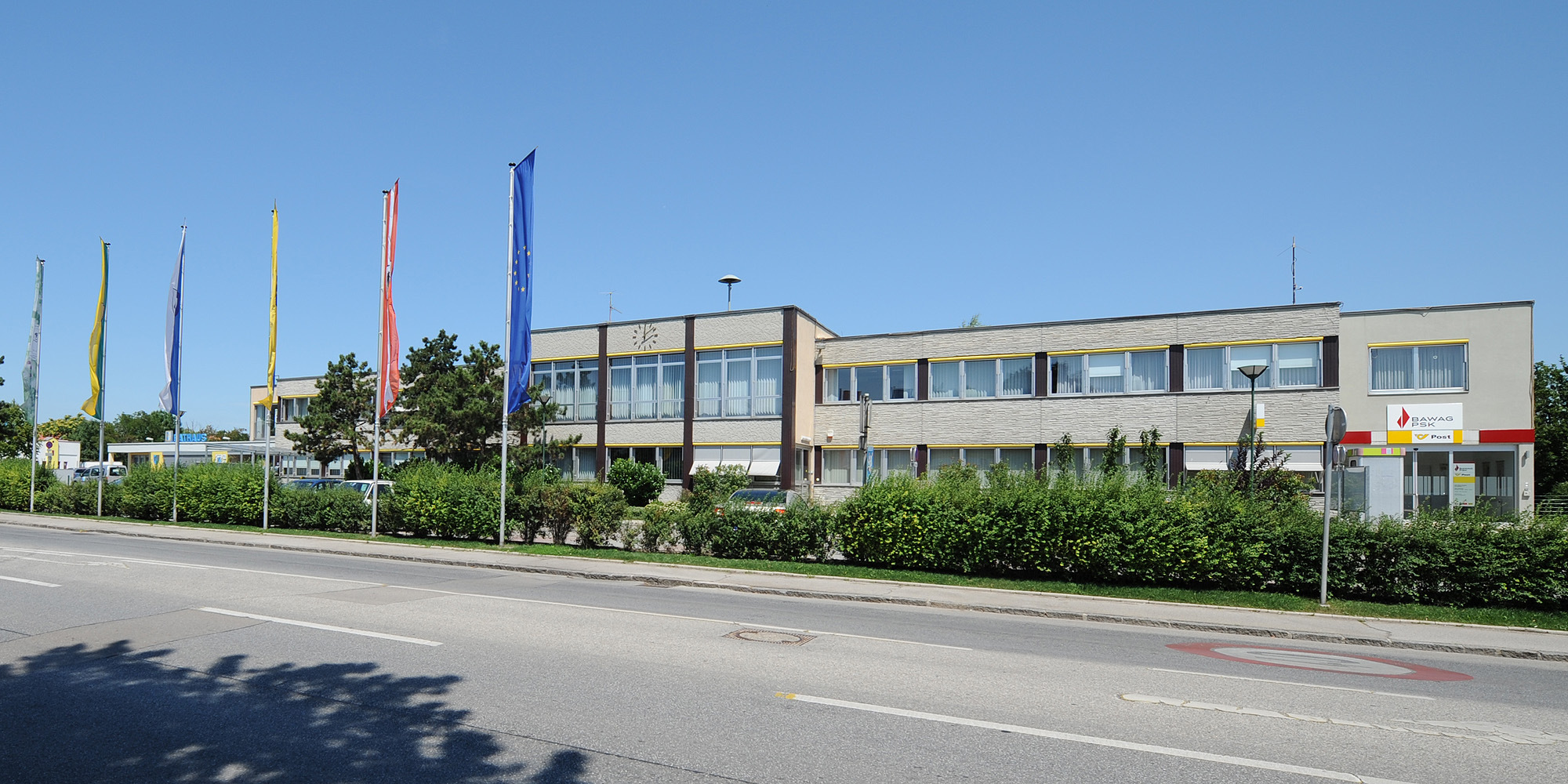

- Flag Coat of arms

- Location within Austria
- Coordinates: 48°5′N 16°19′E
- Country: Austria
- State: Lower Austria
- District: Mödling

Government
  - Mayor: Herbert Janschka (ÖVP)

Area
  - Total: 6.06 km^{2} (2.34 sq mi)
- Elevation: 205 m (673 ft)

Population (2018-01-01)
  - Total: 9,405
  - Density: 1,550/km^{2} (4,020/sq mi)
- Time zone: UTC+1 (CET)
  - Summer (DST): UTC+2 (CEST)
- Postal code: 2351, 2355
- Area code: 02236
- Website: www.wr-neudorf.at

Wiener Neudorf (German pronunciation: [ˈviːnɐ ˈnɔʏdɔʁf]; Central Bavarian: Weana Neiduaf) is an Austrian town in the eastern part of the Mödling district, south of Vösendorf and Maria Enzersdorf, west of Biedermannsdorf, and north of Guntramsdorf.

== History ==
First settled in 4000 B.C., the first mention of Wiener Neudorf was as Nowendorf in the mid-12th century. In 1270 a paper mentioned tolls for traveling from Sollenau and Neudorf. Circa 1500 the 'Feste Neudorf' fortification was destroyed twice by invading Turks. In 1854, Wiener Neudorf became the official name, which stemmed from the postal system development in the early 19th century (Wiener Neudorf gained the letter 'W' to differentiate the name).

Wiener Neudorf industrialisation began in the mid-19th century especially due to the available clay used by the Neudorfer Ziegelwerke of Wienerberger. The Austria Brauerei major brewery was located in Wiener Neudorf as well. By 1900 the telephone network was unified with the neighbouring municipalities and the sewage system had been extended.

Nazi Germany
After the 1938 Anschluss, Wiener Neudorf became part of the 24th municipality of Vienna. Circa 1940 construction of the Flugmotorenwerke Ostmark aircraft engine factory was started at Wiener Neudorf, and forced labor was provided by a subcamp of Mauthausen concentration camp. Allied attacks included the 23 August 1944 raid which bombed the South industrial area of Vienna, including the Wiener Neudorf aircraft engine factory, the Vösendorf oil refinery and Markersdorf Airfield. An earlier bombing was on 26 July 1944. On 6 April 1945 the town fell into Russian hands.

Mödling was returned to Lower Austria in 1954.

== Population ==
Historical population
Year	Pop.	±%
1971	4,072	—
1981	7,933	+94.8%
1991	8,385	+5.7%
2001	8,428	+0.5%

== Politics ==
By seats in the municipal council. Total 33.

Election	ÖVP	SPÖ	Greens	UFO	FPÖ	NEOS
2005	3	18	0	12	0	0
2010	12	17	0	3	1	0
2015	11	15	0	5	2	0
2020	17	11	0	2	2	1
2025	17	10	0	0	5	1

== Traffic ==
Wiener Neudorf lies directly at the B-17 'Wiener Neudstädter Strasse', a major traffic route. Due to the proximity of the Shopping City Süd, the road experiences frequent traffic jams. Also close to the town lies the A2 'Südautobahn'.

== Economy ==
Wiener Neudorf is home to the 'Industriezentrum NÖ Süd', a conglomerate of various industries and major economy factor in the south of Vienna.

== Culture and Sights ==
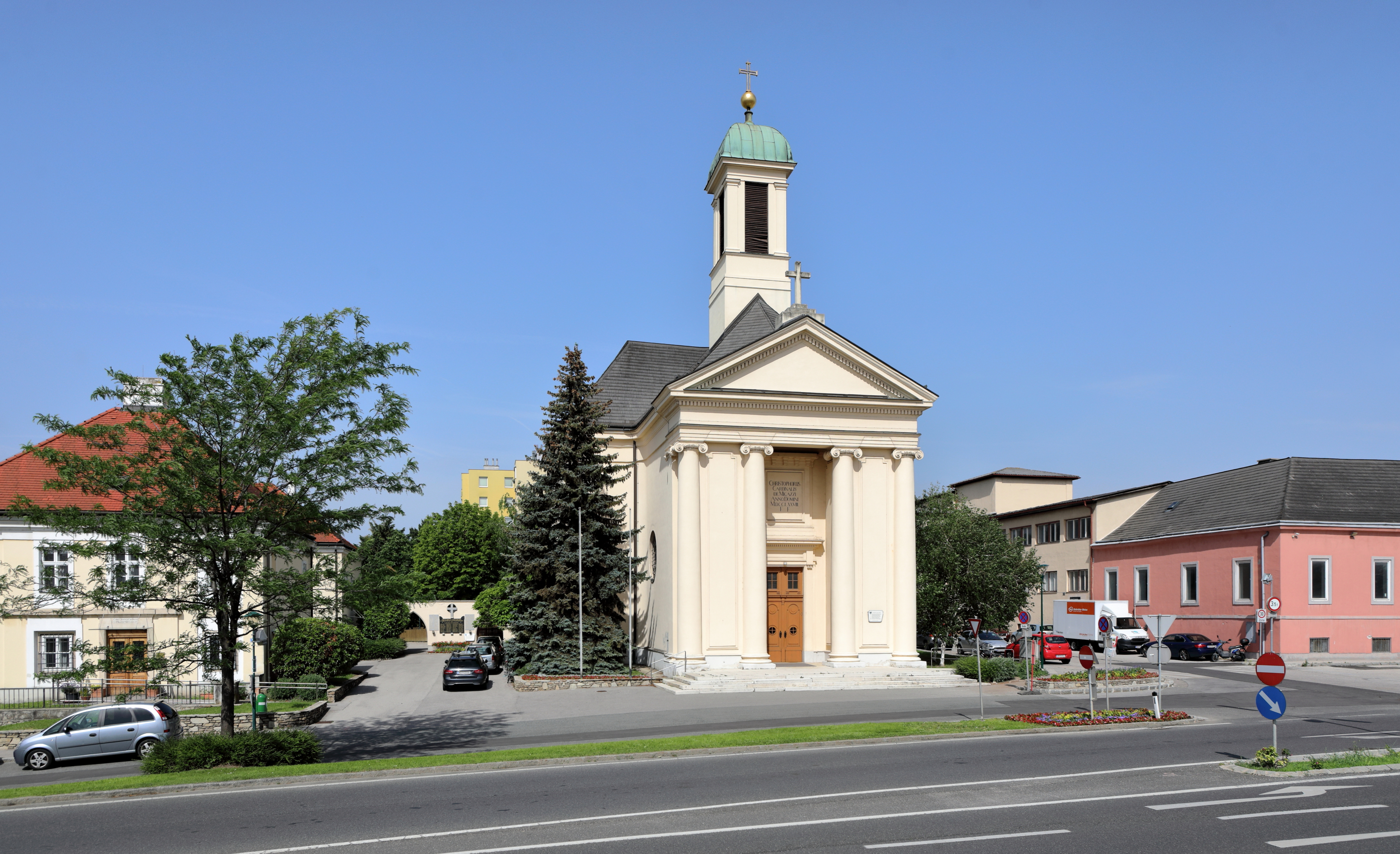
Church „Maria Schnee“

- Altes Rathaus (lit. 'Old town hall') - now a cultural center in Wiener Neudorf.
- Maria Schnee church
- Christoph Migazzi house - another cultural center
