= Flugmotorenwerke Ostmark =

German aircraft engine supplier during World War II

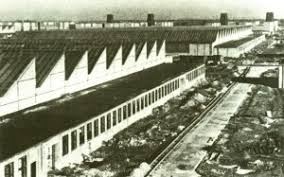
Flugmotorenwerke Ostmark factory in Vienna Neudorf

The Flugmotorenwerke Ostmark GmbH (German for Aircraft Engine Factory Eastern March) was a large German aircraft engine supplier during World War II. It operated as part of the Steyr-Daimler-Puch conglomerate and specialized in the manufacture of aircraft engines for Heinkel.

Three large factories were established, all in or around Vienna: in Wiener Neudorf, in Biedermannsdorf, and in Guntramsdorf. These sites were closely interconnected with the Steyr-Daimler-Puch HQ located nearby. Two branch factories were established; one in Brno in the Protectorate of Bohemia and Moravia, and another one in the Slovenian Maribor, which was annexed by Nazi Germany in 1941. All these sites used slave labour performed by inmates of the Mauthausen-Gusen concentration camp.

After the war, the company's historic sites were taken over by Ecoplus, the Business Agency of Lower Austria. The site of the Zweigwerk factory in Brno-Líšeň was turned over to Zbrojovka Brno and became Zetor, a manufacturer of tractors and agricultural equipment. The iron foundry, which was part of the Brno site, was later acquired by the German company Heunisch-Guss. The Slovenian site become TAM - one of the biggest factorys in Yugoslavia, which produced trucks, buses and vans mostly for public servises and military. It vent bancrupt in 1996. Today, the brand name is modified as TAM-Europe and is a part of a CHTC.
