= Hennersdorf =

Hennersdorf may refer to:

Germany

- Hennersdorf (Augustusburg), Augustusburg, Saxony
- Hennersdorf (Dippoldiswalde), Dippoldiswalde, Saxony
- Hennersdorf (Doberlug-Kirchhain), Doberlug-Kirchhain, Brandenburg
- Hennersdorf (Kamenz), Kamenz, Saxony
- Hennersdorf (Schmiedeberg), Schmiedeberg (Erzgebirge), Saxony

Poland

- former name of Jędrzychowice, Zgorzelec County
- former name of Jędrzychowice, Strzelin County

Czech Republic

- Hennersdorf, former German name of Dubnice, Liberec Region
- Hennersdorf, former German name of Jindřichov (Bruntál District), Moravian-Silesian Region

Austria

- Hennersdorf, Mödling District, Lower Austria

== See also ==
- Katholisch Hennersdorf
- Großhennersdorf
