= Boys Choir of the Vienna Woods =

Boys Choir of the Vienna Woods Sängerknaben vom Wienerwald
- Choir
- Origin: Maria Enzersdorf, Lower Austria, Austria
- Founded: 1921
- Founder: Stanislaus Marusczyk
- Disbanded: 2014
- Headquarters: Missionshaus St. Gabriel

The Boys Choir of the Vienna Woods (German: Sängerknaben vom Wienerwald) was a children's choir in Maria Enzersdorf, south of Vienna, in the state of Lower Austria. The choir resided at the Missionshaus St. Gabriel.

== History ==
The Boys Choir of the Vienna Woods was founded by Stanislaus Marusczyk, a missionary from the Society of the Divine Word, in Maria Enzersdorf in 1921. Initially, the choir mainly focused on music in the worship services and celebrations at the Missionshaus St. Gabriel, where the school was based. The choir soon began concert tours through Austria, and later to neighboring countries.

The choir dissolved in 2014.
