= Gaaden =

Gaaden Goodn
- Municipality
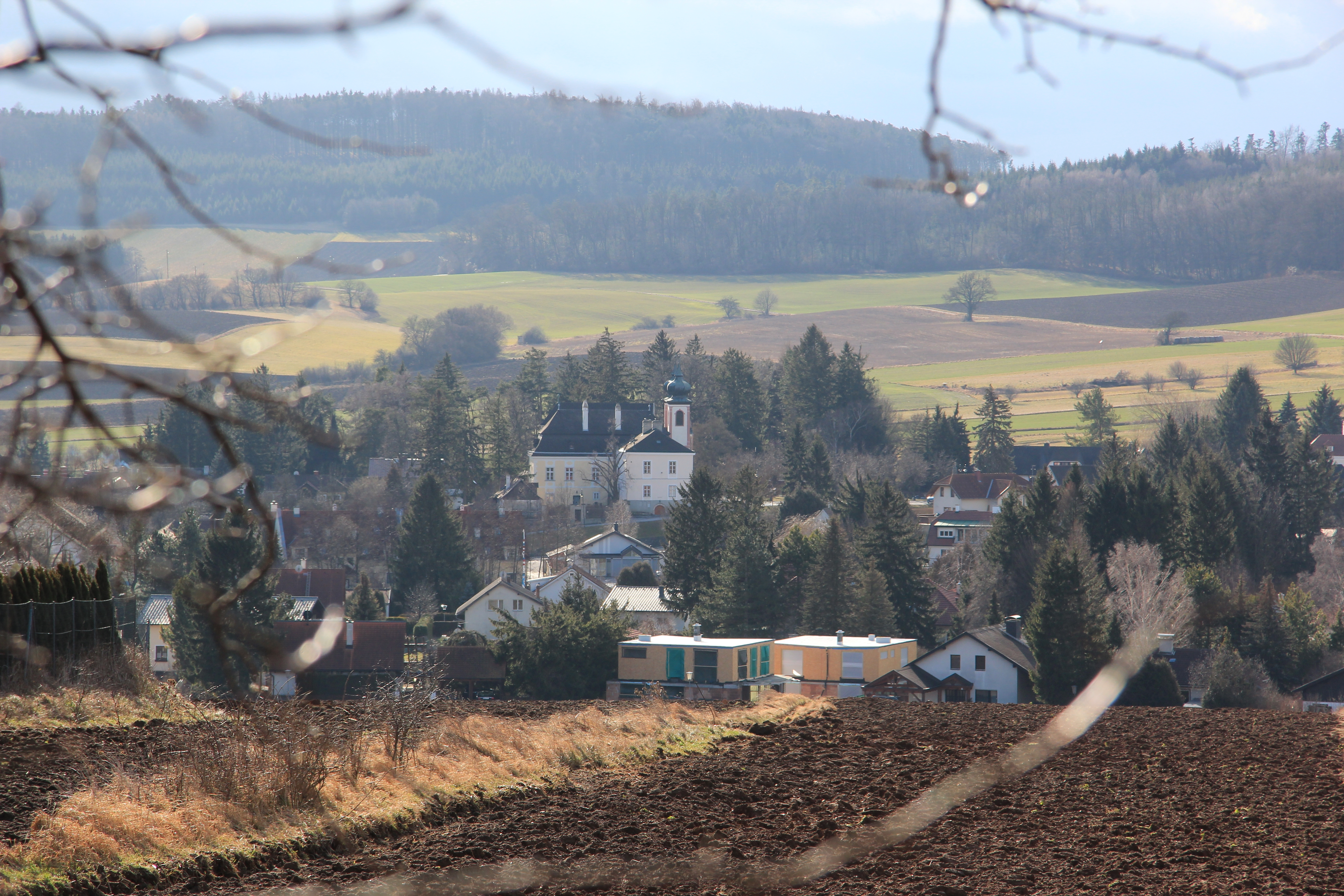

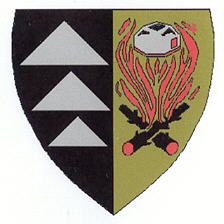
- Coat of arms

- Location within Austria
- Coordinates: 48°3′N 16°12′E
- Country: Austria
- State: Lower Austria
- District: Mödling

Government
  - Mayor: Rainer Schramm

Area
  - Total: 24.78 km^{2} (9.57 sq mi)
- Elevation: 323 m (1,060 ft)

Population (2018-01-01)
  - Total: 1,624
  - Density: 65.54/km^{2} (169.7/sq mi)
- Time zone: UTC+1 (CET)
  - Summer (DST): UTC+2 (CEST)
- Postal code: 2531
- Area code: 02237
- Website: www.gaaden.at

Gaaden (Central Bavarian: Goodn) is a town in the district of Mödling in the Austrian state of Lower Austria.

== Geography ==
Gaaden lies in the northern Vienna woods at the foot of the Anninger.

== Population ==
Historical population
Year	Pop.	±%
1971	783	—
1981	1,000	+27.7%
1991	1,211	+21.1%
2001	1,435	+18.5%
2011	1,613	+12.4%
