= Stephan Tragl =

Was a German-Bohemian architect (1845)

Stephan Tragl (October 17, 1845 in Haid, Kingdom of Bohemia; died May 1, 1891 in Prague) was a German-Bohemian architect who primarily lived and worked in Prague. His designs adhered to Historicism and the Italian Neo-Renaissance style but also incorporated elements of Neobaroque and Neo-rococo styles. His religious buildings were designed in the Neo-Romanesque and Neo-Gothic styles.

== Life and work ==
Stephan Tragl was born in Haid in Western Bohemia as the son of Josef Tragl. He attended secondary school in Taus and later studied at the Prague Polytechnic. From 1868, he succeeded Josef Schulz (1840–1917) as an assistant at the German Chair of Architecture at the Prague Polytechnic. Later, he worked on railway construction in the Kingdom of Bohemia, contributing to projects in Karlsbad, Příbram, and Pilsen.

By the late 1870s, he settled in Prague, where he established the architectural firm Atelier Tragl in Smíchov. Among those working in his firm were the Pilsen-based architect Josef Farkač (1863–1930), site manager Vincenz Müller, and architect Josef Alexander.

Since 1869, Tragl was a member of the Prague German Polytechnic Association as well as the Association of Architects and Engineers of the Kingdom of Bohemia. In 1879, he was appointed as a member of the German Polytechnic Association's Technical Affairs Committee alongside architects Josef Benischek (1841–1896), Johann Koch (1850–1915), and Friedrich Benedikt.

From 1882, Tragl was also a member of the building commission for the construction of the German Theater in Prague, a project considered his most significant contribution.

Between 1886 and his death, he worked on three projects in the estate of Countess Aloisia Czernin-Morzin (1832–1907) in Hohenelbe: the Deanery Church of St. Lawrence, St. Paul’s Hospital, and the castle chapel (a burial chapel with a crypt). Tragl designed several similar burial chapels in a series, including in Stružná (Gießhübel near Karlsbad), Všenory (Wschenor near Prague), and the Riedel family burial chapel in Desná (Dessendorf).

As an associate of Josef Benischek, he also participated in the committee for the preparation of the Prague Jubilee Exhibition of 1891.

Tragl was unmarried and died on May 1, 1891, at the age of 46 from tuberculosis.

== Selected works ==
- c. 1870: Haid – Bor u Tachova, Malé náměstí 289 – Neo-Gothic renovation of the Chapel of St. John the Baptist at the former hospital
- Haid – Bor u Tachova, Školní 121 – Six-class general primary school, now a kindergarten
- Haid – Bor u Tachova, Plzeňská 231 – Girls' school of the Sisters of Mercy of St. Charles Borromeo, now a secondary school
- 1875–1877: Villa Raczyński in Bregenz, Schloßbergstraße 11, co-designed with Josef Doubek, converted into the Marienberg Monastery in 1904 (protected monument No. 22246)
- 1877: German Girls’ Lyceum in New Town, Prague, Charvátova/Vladislavova – Neo-Renaissance style, demolished
- 1881: Prague Gymnastics Association clubhouse and gymnasium, Prague New Town, Opletalova 26, built by Josef Blecha (1841–1900)
- 1881–1883: Renovation of the Church of Assumption of Mary in Brüx
- 1886–1889: Deanery Church of St. Lawrence, Hohenelbe – Vrchlabí, náměstí Míru, with Josef Farkač and Josef Alexander, built by Vincenz Müller
- 1887–1891: Morzin Castle Chapel, Neo-Gothic style with crypt (burial chapel of the Czernin-Morzin family) in Hohenelbe – Vrchlabí, Dobrovského
- 1890–1891: St. Paul’s Hospital in Hohenelbe – Vrchlabí, Husova 212, now a children’s and youth home
- 1888: Apartment building in Prague, Hybernská 1011/28, built for Franz Preidl, constructed by Josef Blecha
- 1888: Music pavilion in the garden of the German Casino in Prague
- 1889: Neo-Gothic residential building in Prague, Klimentská 1245/5
- 1889–1891: Synagogue in Königinhof – Dvůr Králové, 17. listopadu, with Josef Farkač – Neo-Romanesque style, demolished in the 1960s
- 1889–1890: German House in Theresienstadt – Terezín, Náměstí ČSA 85, Neo-Renaissance style
- 1889: Expansion of the Ringhoffer Works in Prague-Smíchov
- 1884: St. Anna Chapel in Gießhübel – Stružná, commissioned by Countess Anna von Nostitz, with Josef Alexander
- 1889–1890: St. John the Baptist Chapel in Všenory – Built as the Nolč family burial chapel
- 1889–1890: Riedel family burial chapel in Desná
- 1891: Restaurant pavilion for the Pilsner Brewery at the Prague Jubilee Exhibition

== Gallery of completed buildings ==
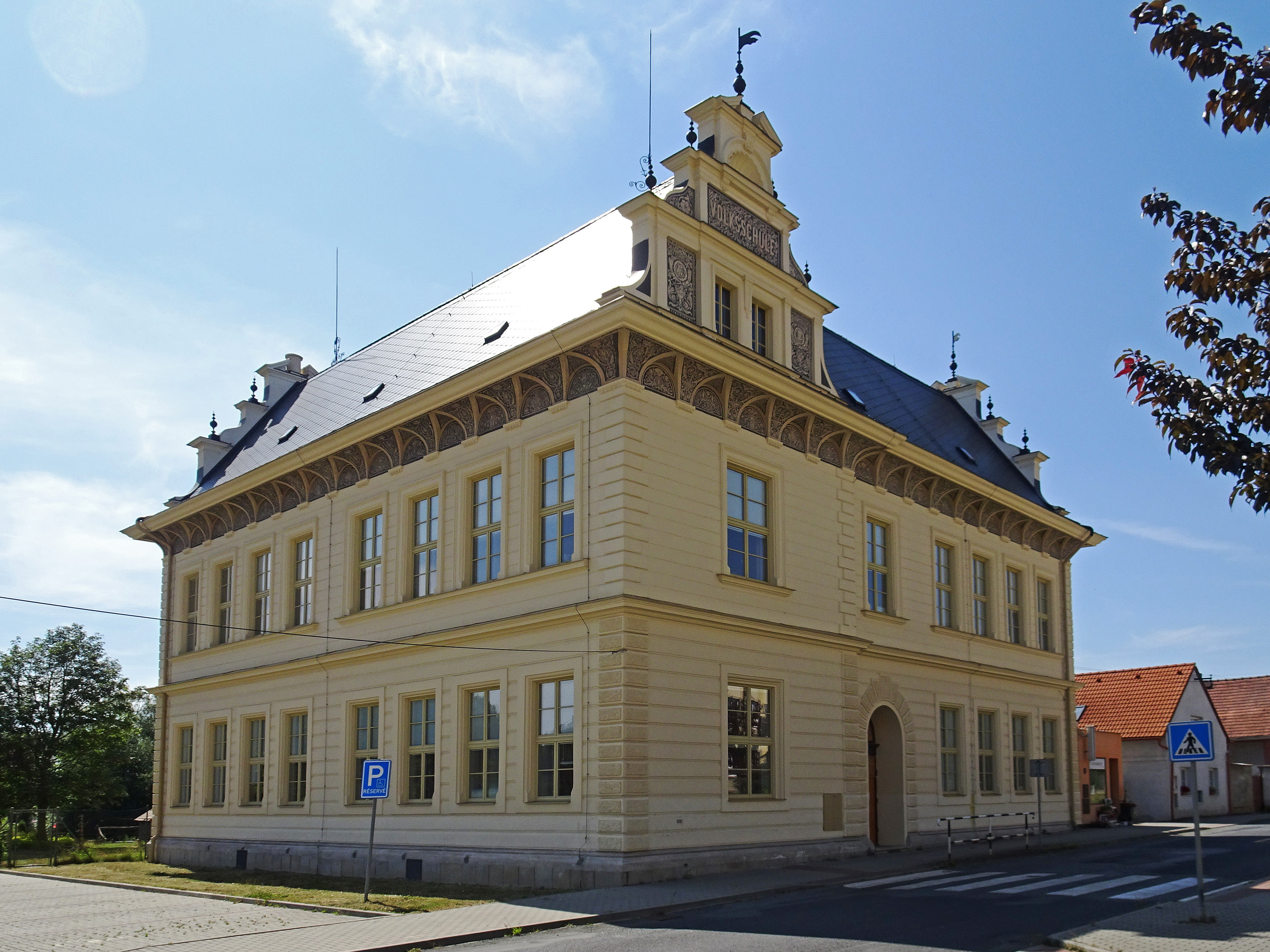
Primary school in Haid

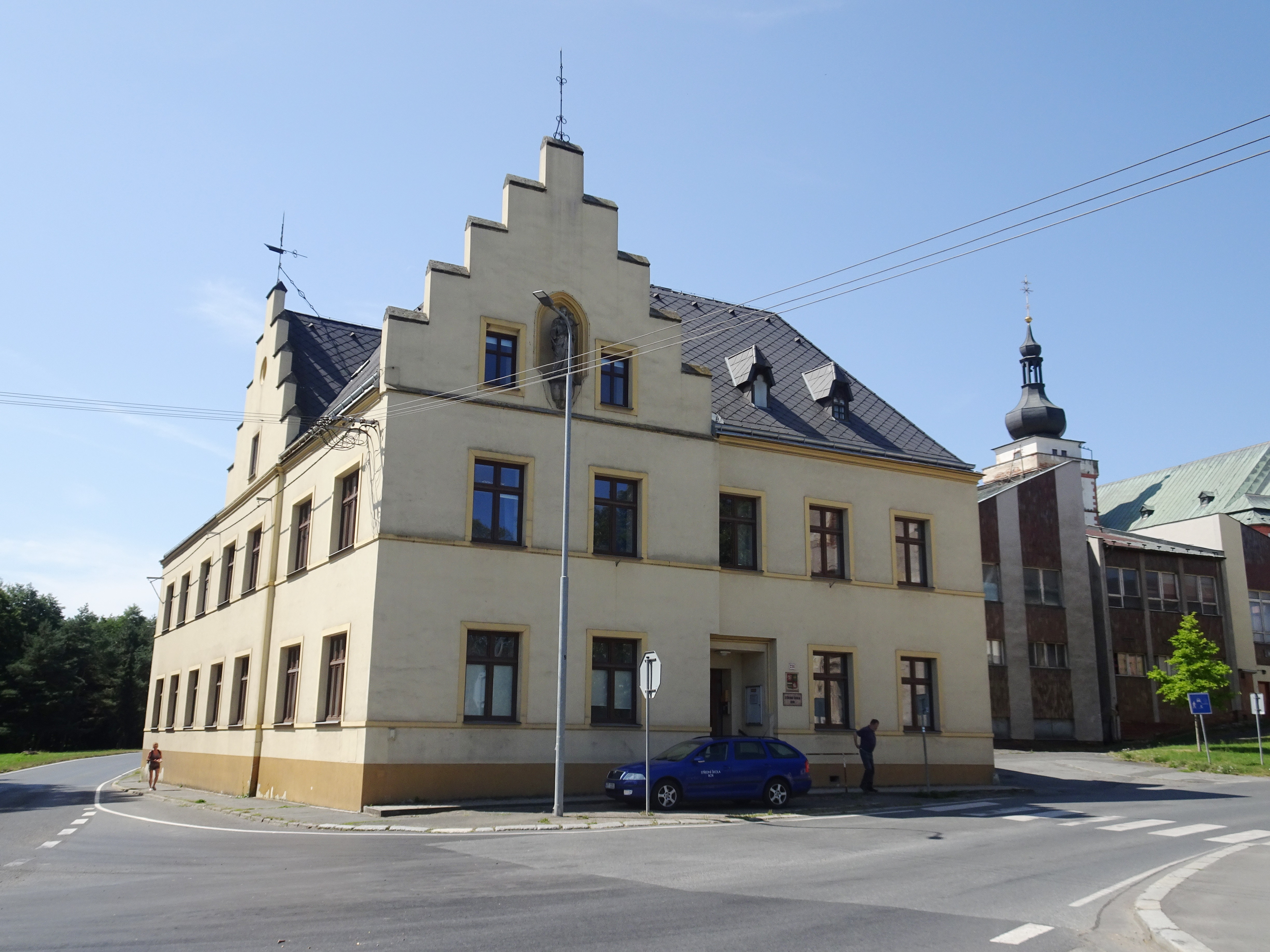
Secondary school in Haid

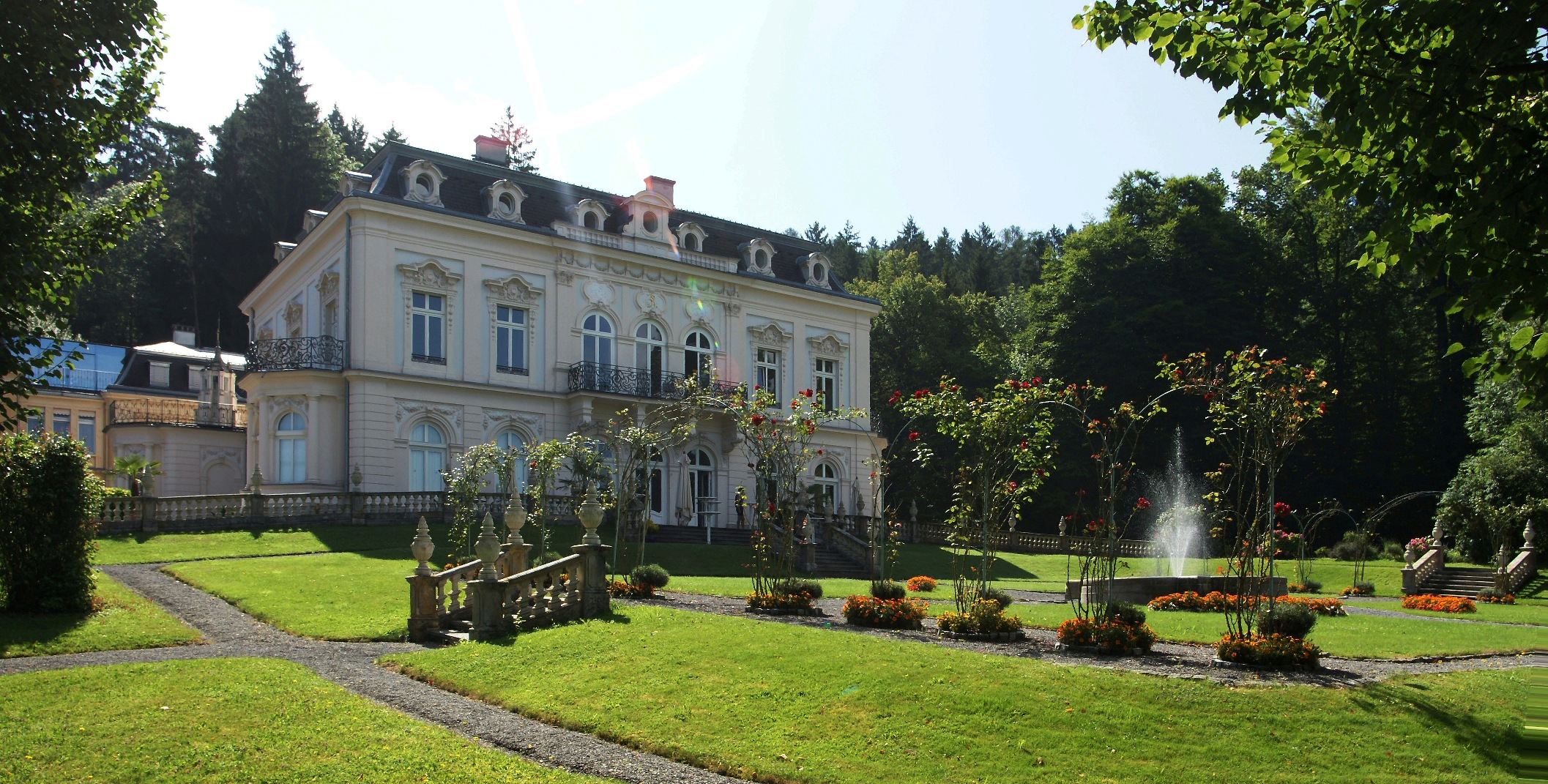
Villa Raczyński in Bregenz

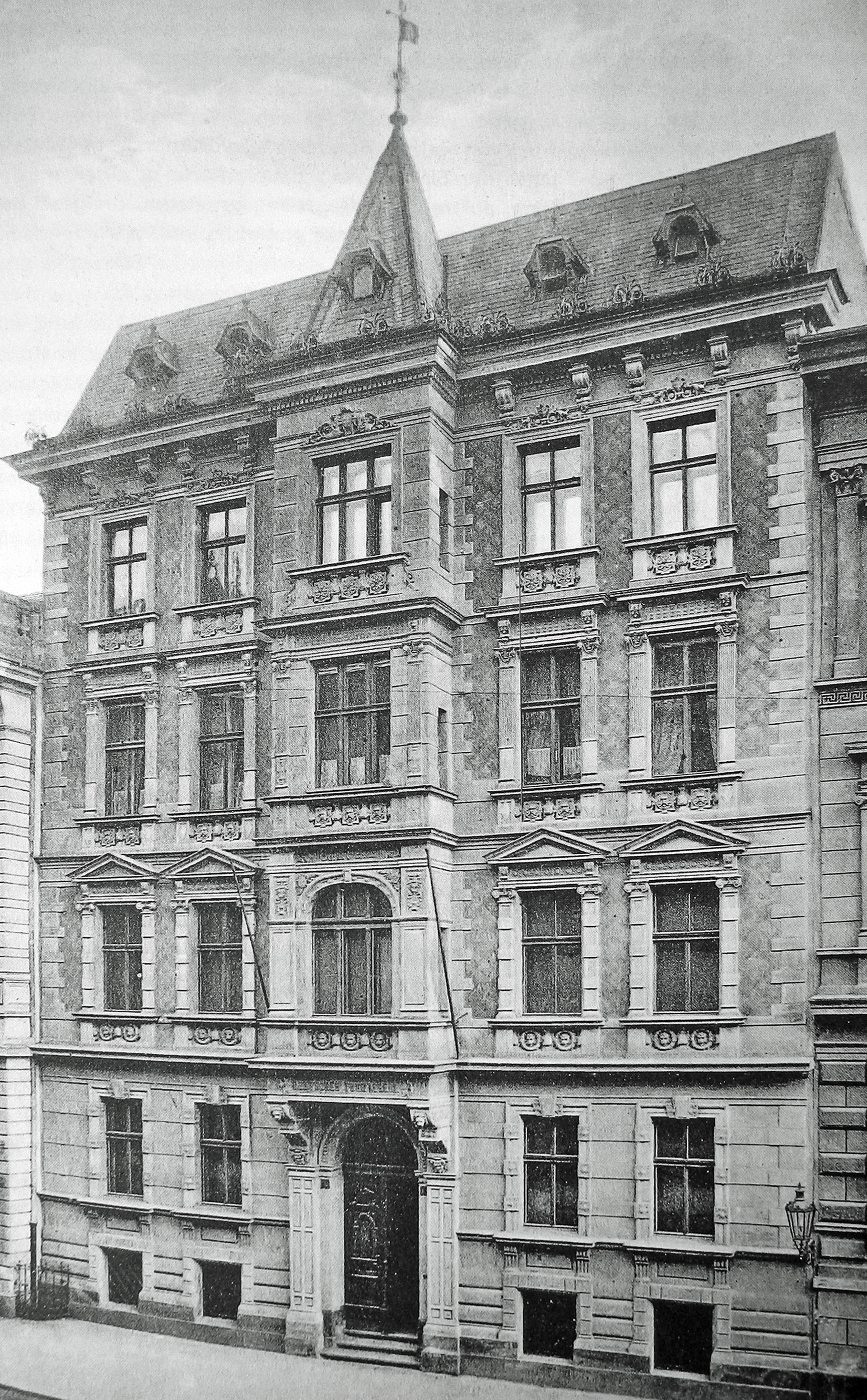
Former German Clubhouse in Prague

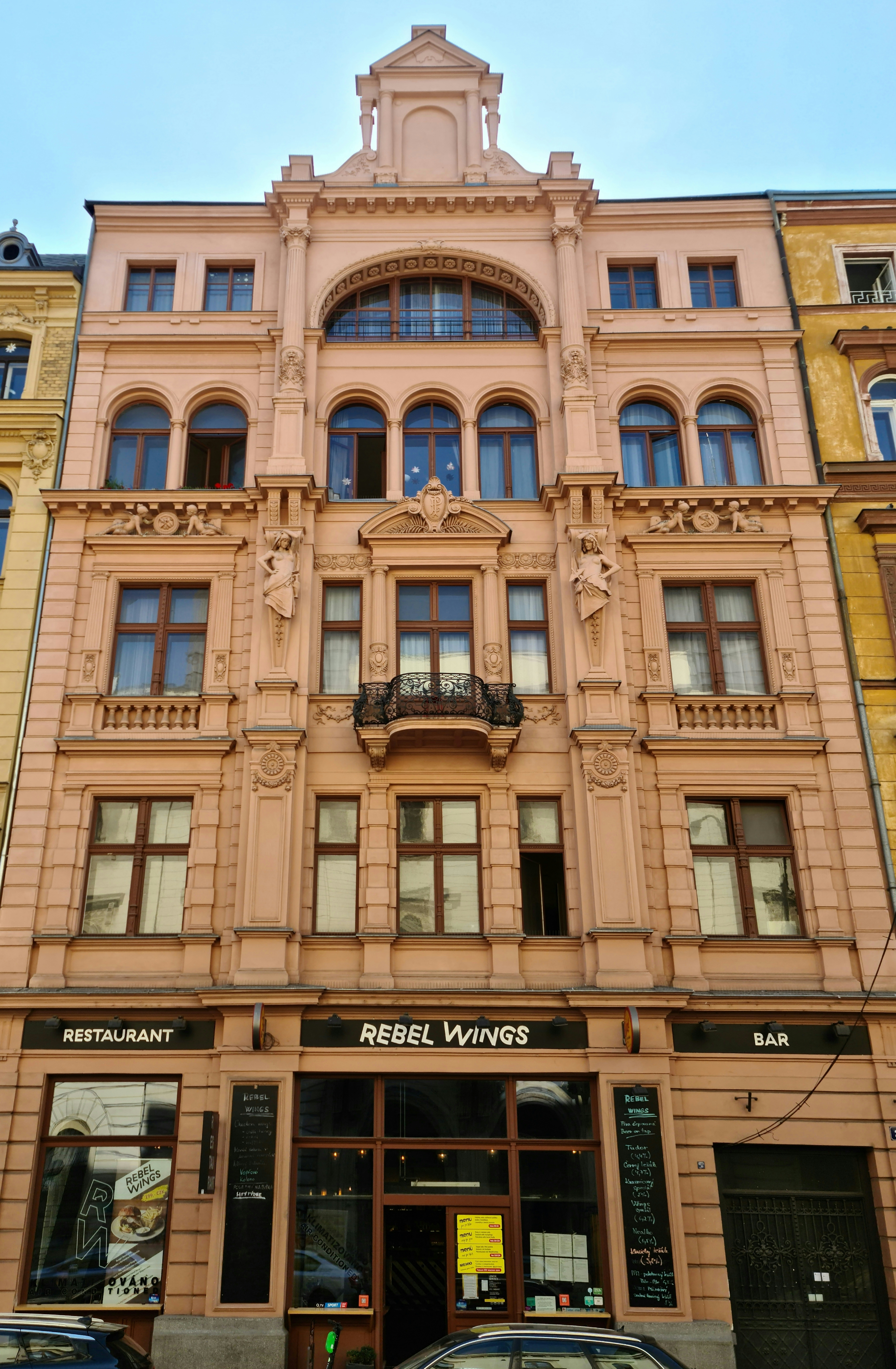
Apartment building in Prague

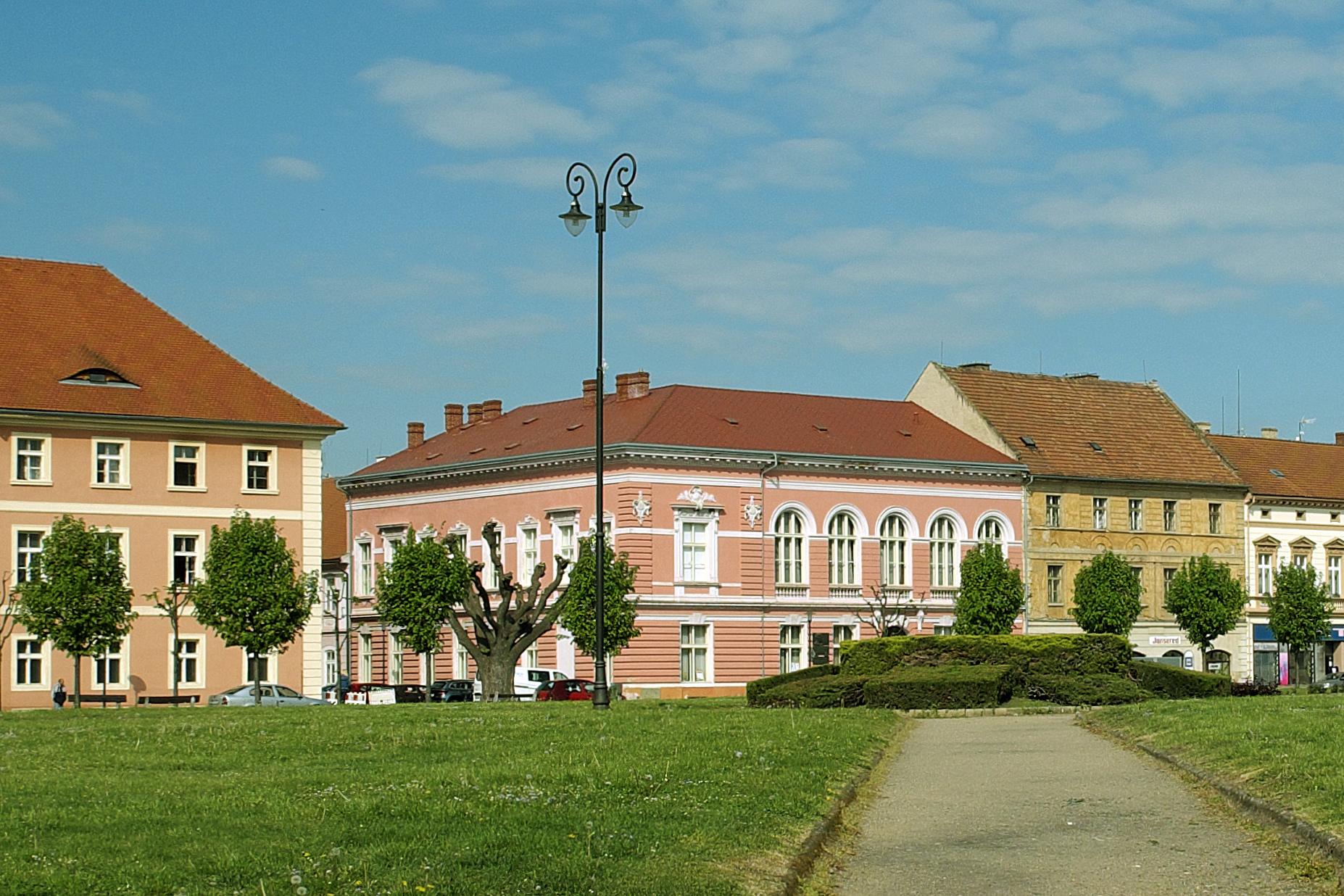
Former German Clubhouse in Theresienstadt

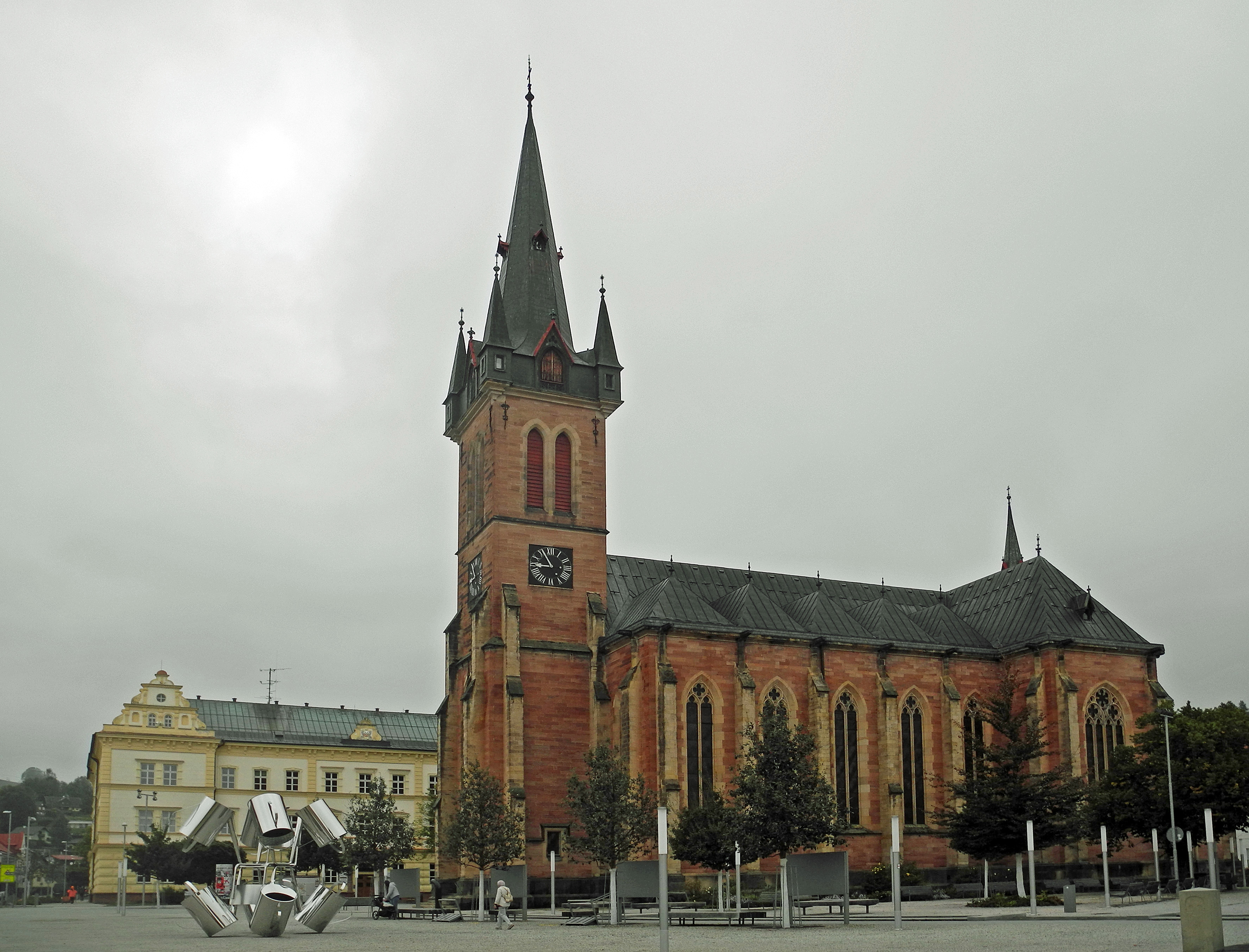
St. Lawrence Church in Hohenelbe

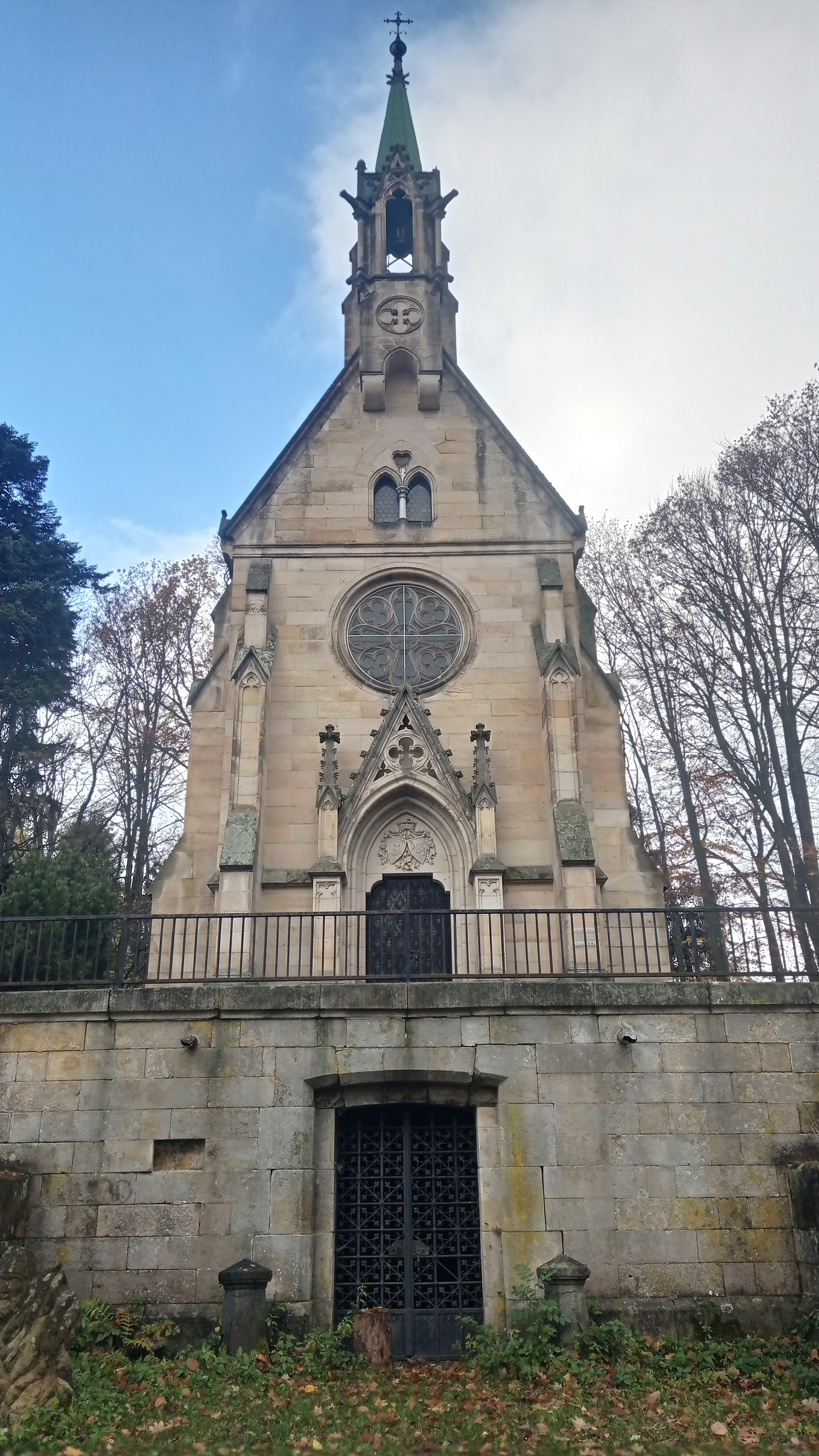
Funerary chapel in Hohenelbe

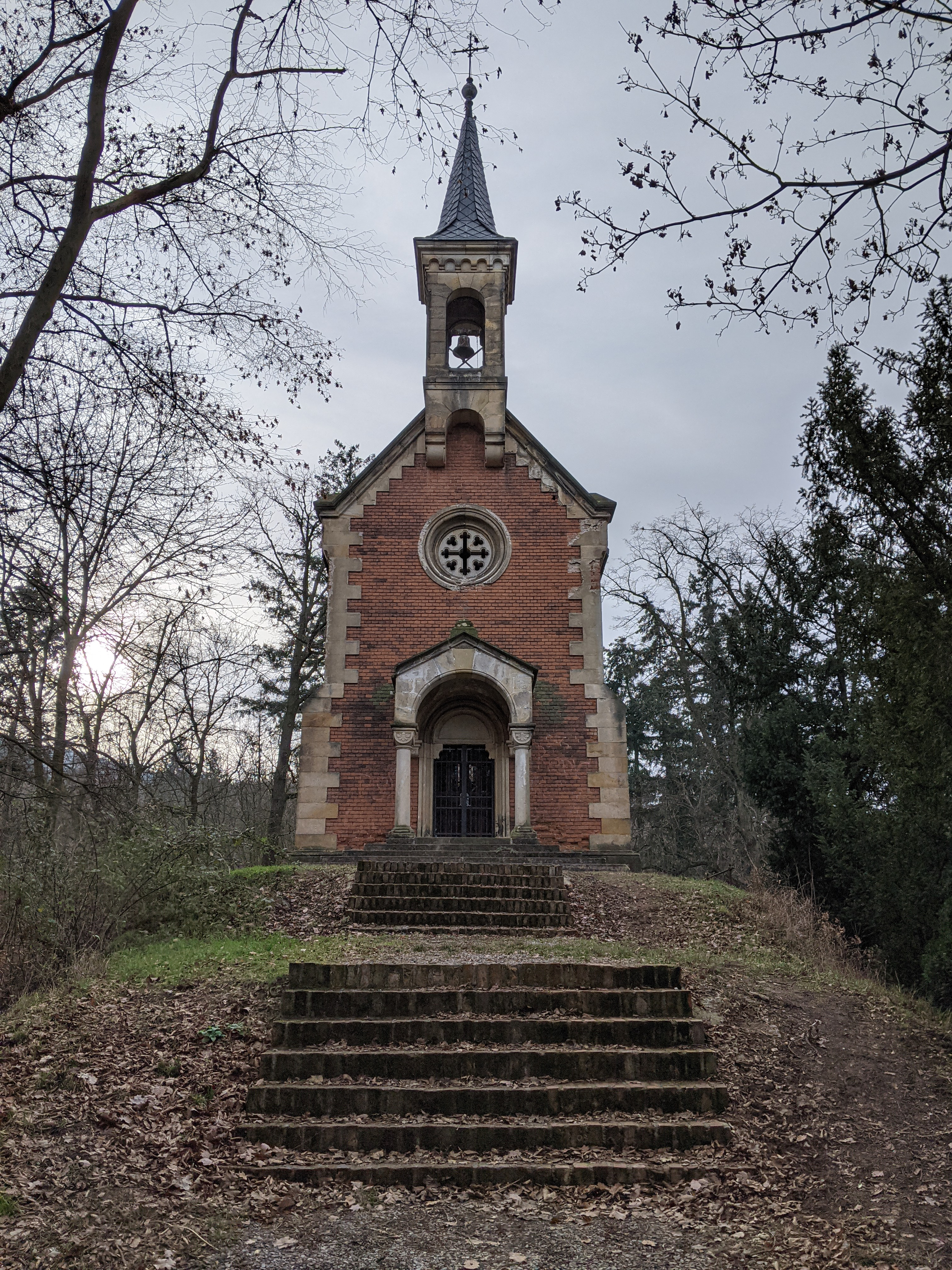
Funerary chapel in Všenory

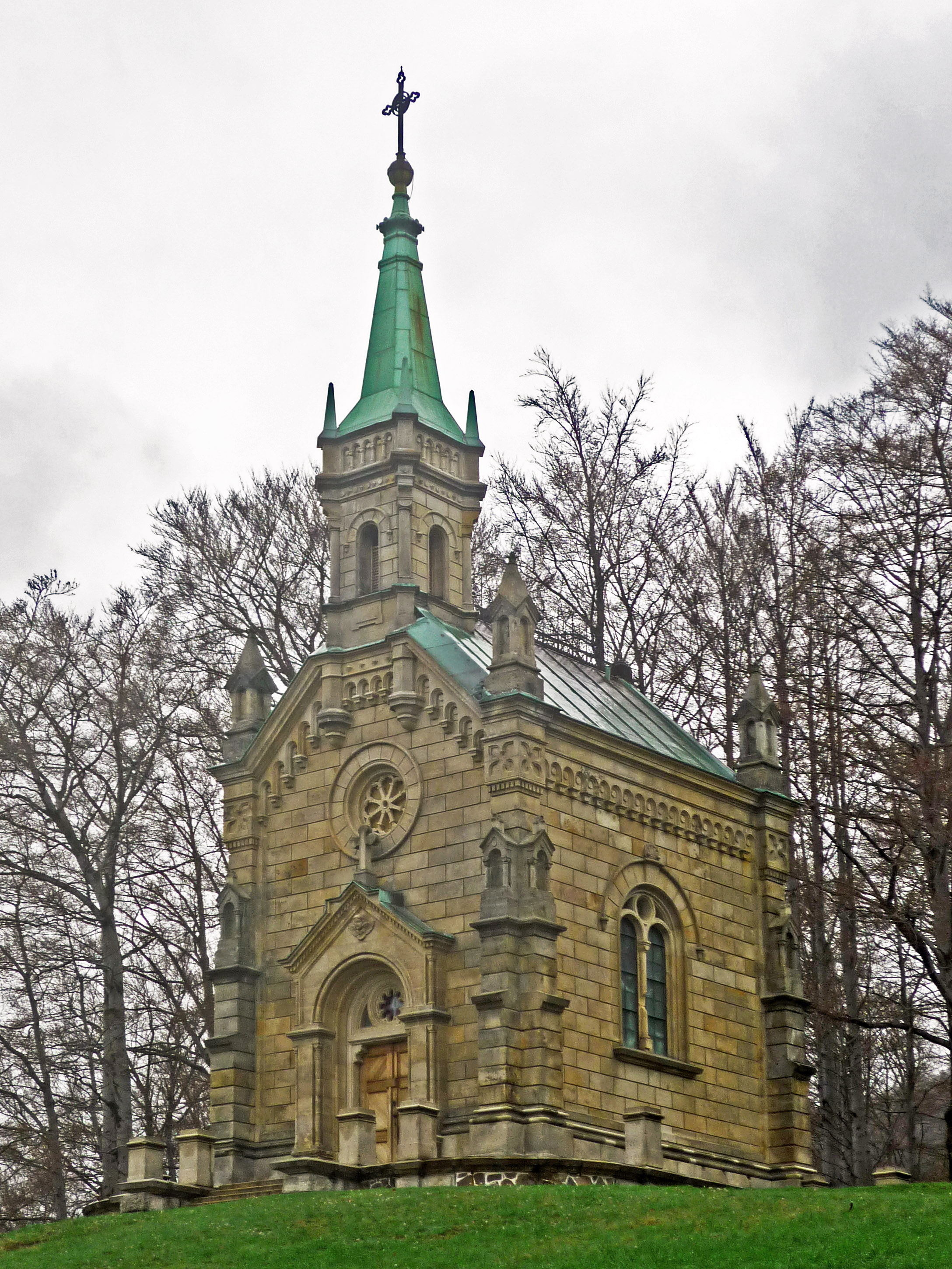
Riedel funerary chapel in Desná
