= Gießhübl =

Gießhübl Gißhiwe
- Municipality
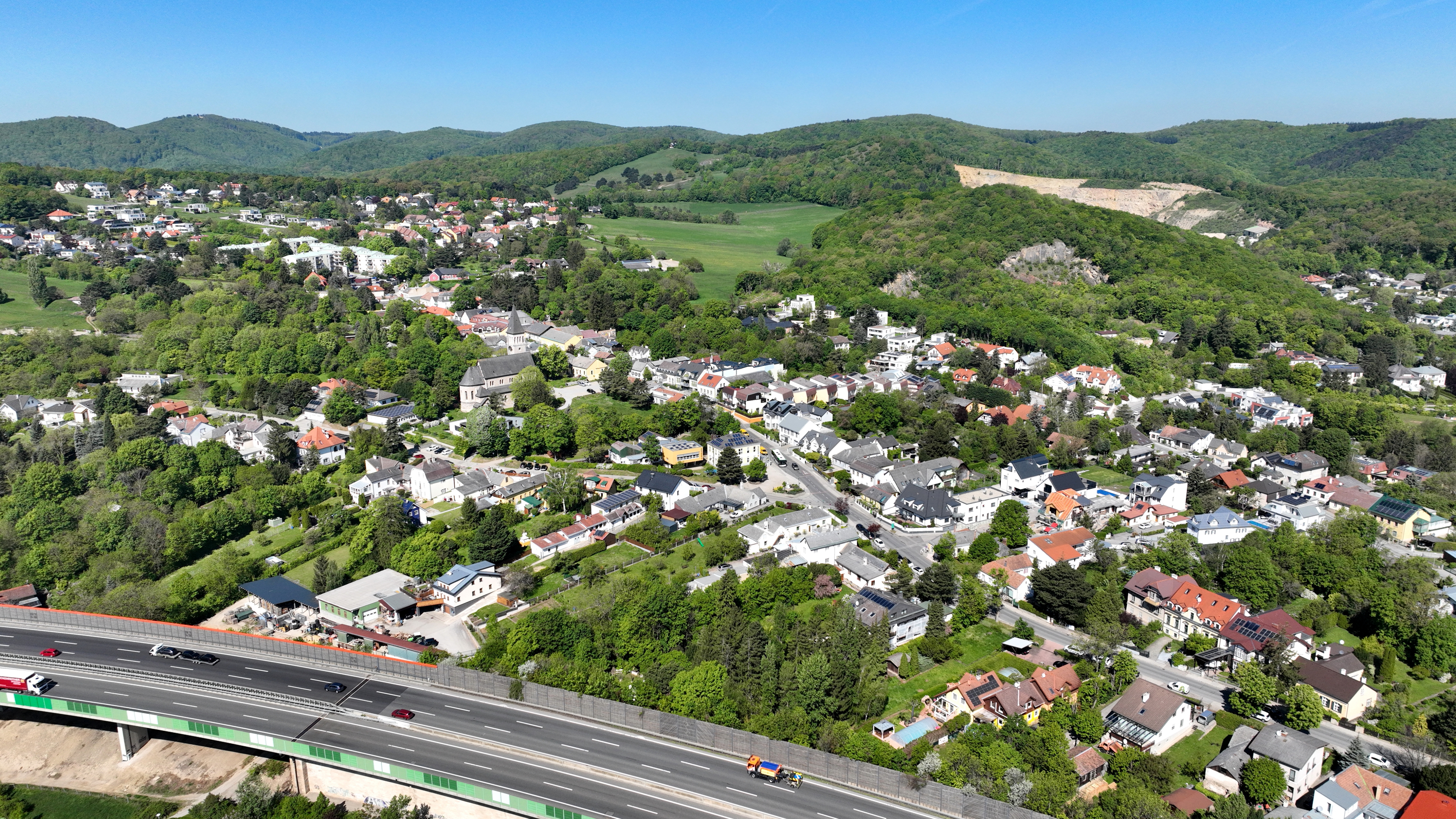
- East-southeast view of Gießhübl

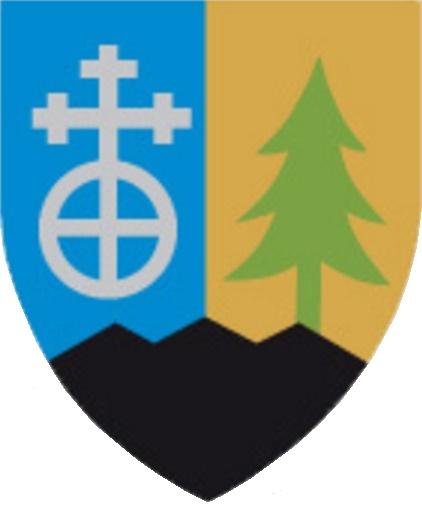
- Coat of arms

- Location within Austria
- Coordinates: 47°50′N 16°5′E
- Country: Austria
- State: Lower Austria
- District: Mödling

Government
  - Mayor: Helmut Kargl (ÖVP)

Area
  - Total: 3.9 km^{2} (1.5 sq mi)
- Elevation: 416 m (1,365 ft)

Population (2018-01-01)
  - Total: 2,335
  - Density: 600/km^{2} (1,600/sq mi)
- Time zone: UTC+1 (CET)
  - Summer (DST): UTC+2 (CEST)
- Postal code: 2372
- Area code: 02236
- Website: www.giesshuebl.at

Gießhübl (Central Bavarian: Gißhiwe) is a town in the district of Mödling in the Austrian state of Lower Austria. It is located in the south of Vienna, the Austrian capital, neighboring the nature protection area Föhrenberge. With an altitude of 416 m, Gießhübl is the highest-located wine-growing district in Lower Austria. Originally Gießhübl was an agrarian village. Today it is mainly a residential area because of its vicinity to Vienna and the direct connection to the highway A21.

== History ==
Gießhübl was founded in 1592 from a settlement with rural structures. In the period from 1938 to 1954 Gießhübl (together with 96 other communities of Lower Austria) was part of Greater Vienna. In 1954 Gießhübl became again a separate municipality in the province of Lower Austria. This was celebrated in September 2004 with a large 50-year celebration. The population grew from 975 in 1971 to 1907 in 2006.

== Population ==
Historical population
Year	Pop.	±%
1971	975	—
1981	1,459	+49.6%
1991	1,609	+10.3%
2001	1,597	−0.7%
2009	2,093	+31.1%

== Economy and infrastructure ==
In 2001 there were 91 non-agricultural workplaces. In 1999 there were 14 agricultural and forestry businesses. According to the census 2001, the number of employed was 730, and the employment rate was 48.02 percent.

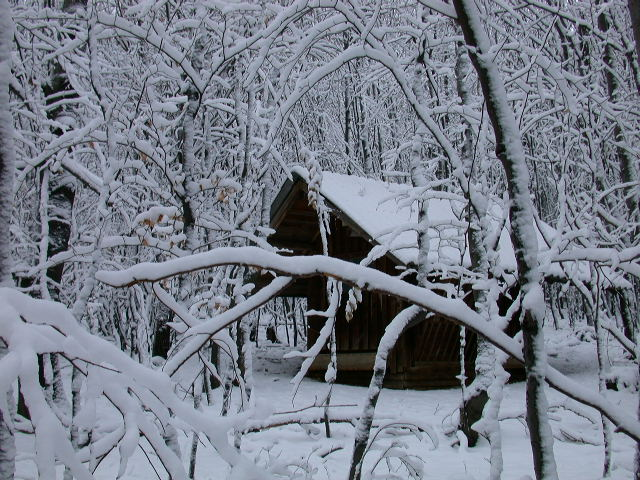
In the forest of Gießhübl in January

== Organizations ==
- Theater company Karl-Theater Gießhübl
- Soccer club 1.FC Gießhübl (https://web.archive.org/web/20090301011021/http://www.fcgiesshuebl.at/)
- Gießhübl firefighters (https://web.archive.org/web/20090103035745/http://www.ff-giesshuebl.at/index2.htm)
