= Achau =

- Municipality
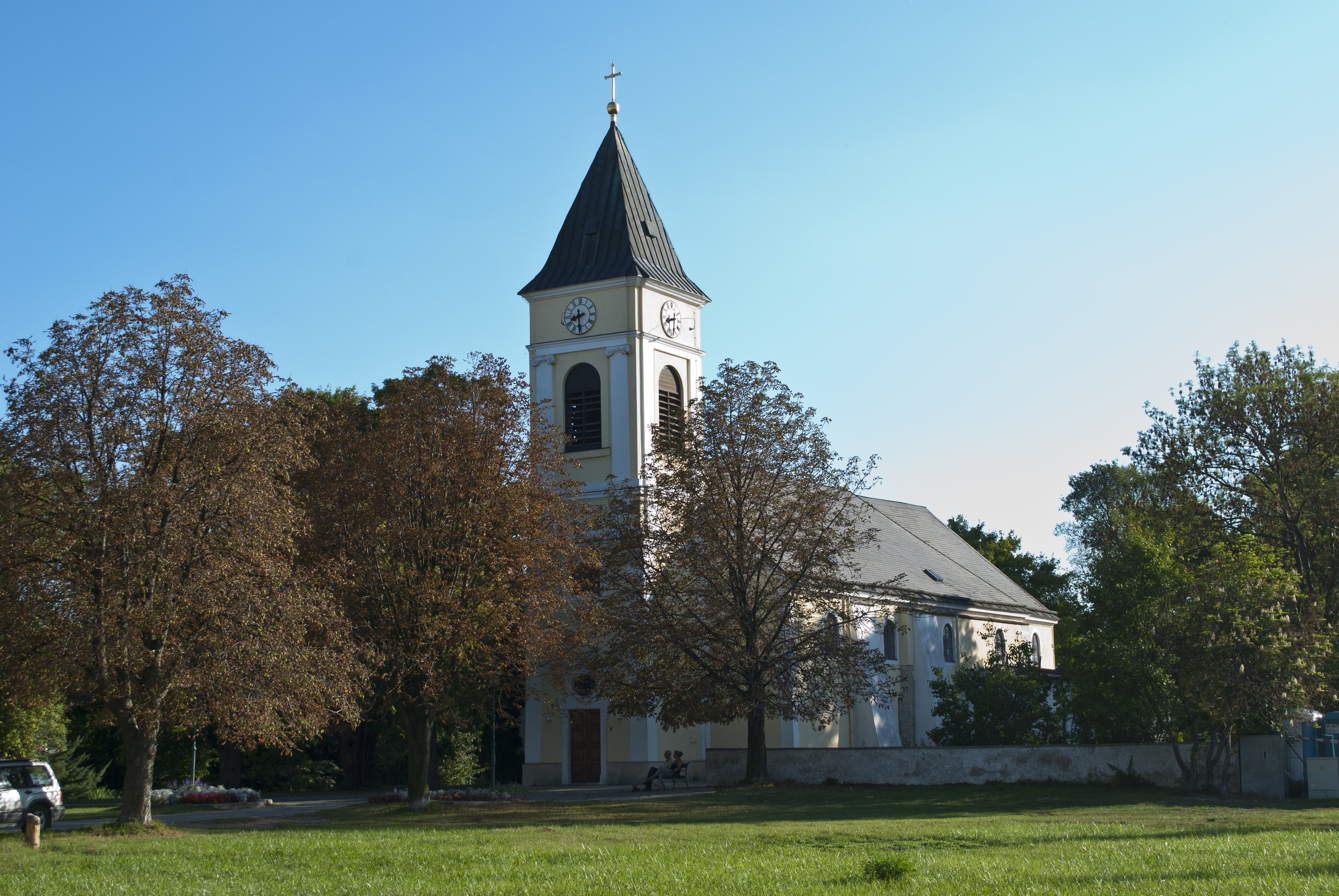
- Catholic church in Achau

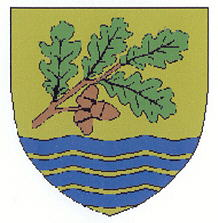
- Coat of arms

- Location within Austria
- Coordinates: 48°5′N 16°20′E
- Country: Austria
- State: Lower Austria
- District: Mödling

Government
  - Mayor: Josef Brunner

Area
  - Total: 11.88 km^{2} (4.59 sq mi)
- Elevation: 185 m (607 ft)

Population (2018-01-01)
  - Total: 1,415
  - Density: 119.1/km^{2} (308.5/sq mi)
- Time zone: UTC+1 (CET)
  - Summer (DST): UTC+2 (CEST)
- Postal code: 2481
- Area code: 02236

Achau is a town in the district of Mödling in the Austrian state of Lower Austria.

== History ==
After the Anschluss in 1938, Achau became a part of Greater Vienna, but returned to Lower Austria after the war.

== Population ==
Historical population
Year	Pop.	±%
1971	1,017	—
1981	942	−7.4%
1991	1,062	+12.7%
2001	1,153	+8.6%
2011	1,239	+7.5%

== Sport ==
The Achau golf course is one of the few in the area serving the local Mödling population.
