= Hennersdorf bei Wien =

Hennersdorf Hennasduaf
- Municipality
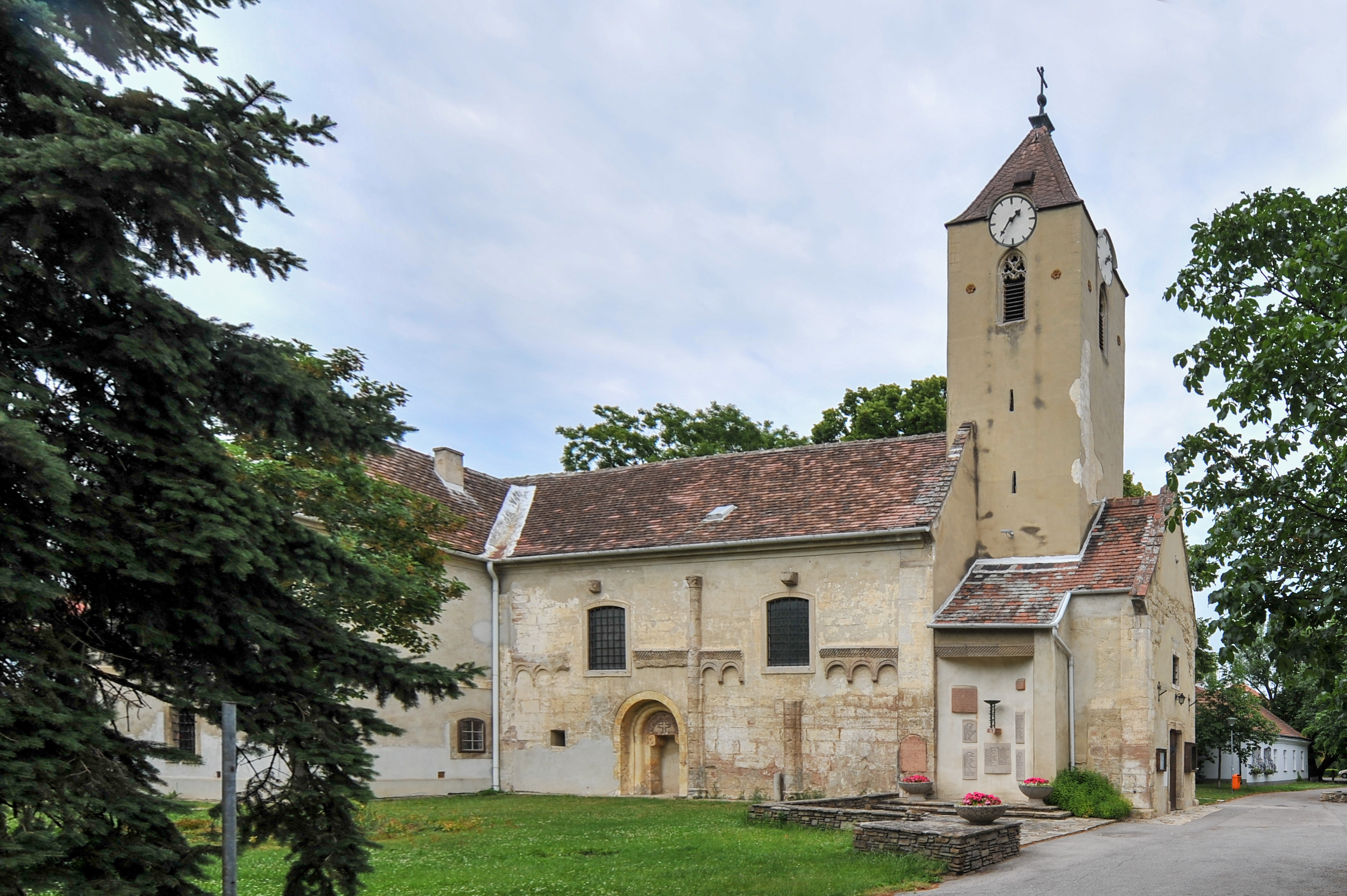
- Church in Hennersdorf

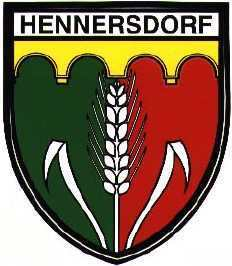
- Coat of arms

- Location within Austria
- Coordinates: 48°6′N 16°22′E
- Country: Austria
- State: Lower Austria
- District: Mödling

Government
  - Mayor: Ferdinand Hausenberger

Area
  - Total: 5.44 km^{2} (2.10 sq mi)
- Elevation: 183 m (600 ft)

Population (2018-01-01)
  - Total: 1,541
  - Density: 283/km^{2} (734/sq mi)
- Time zone: UTC+1 (CET)
  - Summer (DST): UTC+2 (CEST)
- Postal code: 2332
- Area code: 02235
- Website: www.gemeinde-hennersdorf.at

Hennersdorf (or Hennersdorf bei Wien; Central Bavarian: Hennasduaf) is a town in the district of Mödling in the Austrian state of Lower Austria.

== Geography ==
Hennersdorf lies in the northeast corner of the district and borders directly on Vienna.

== Population ==
Historical population
Year	Pop.	±%
1971	814	—
1981	1,006	+23.6%
1991	1,483	+47.4%
2001	1,418	−4.4%
2011	1,462	+3.1%
