= Kaltenleutgeben =

Kaltenleutgeben Koidnleitgebn
- Municipality
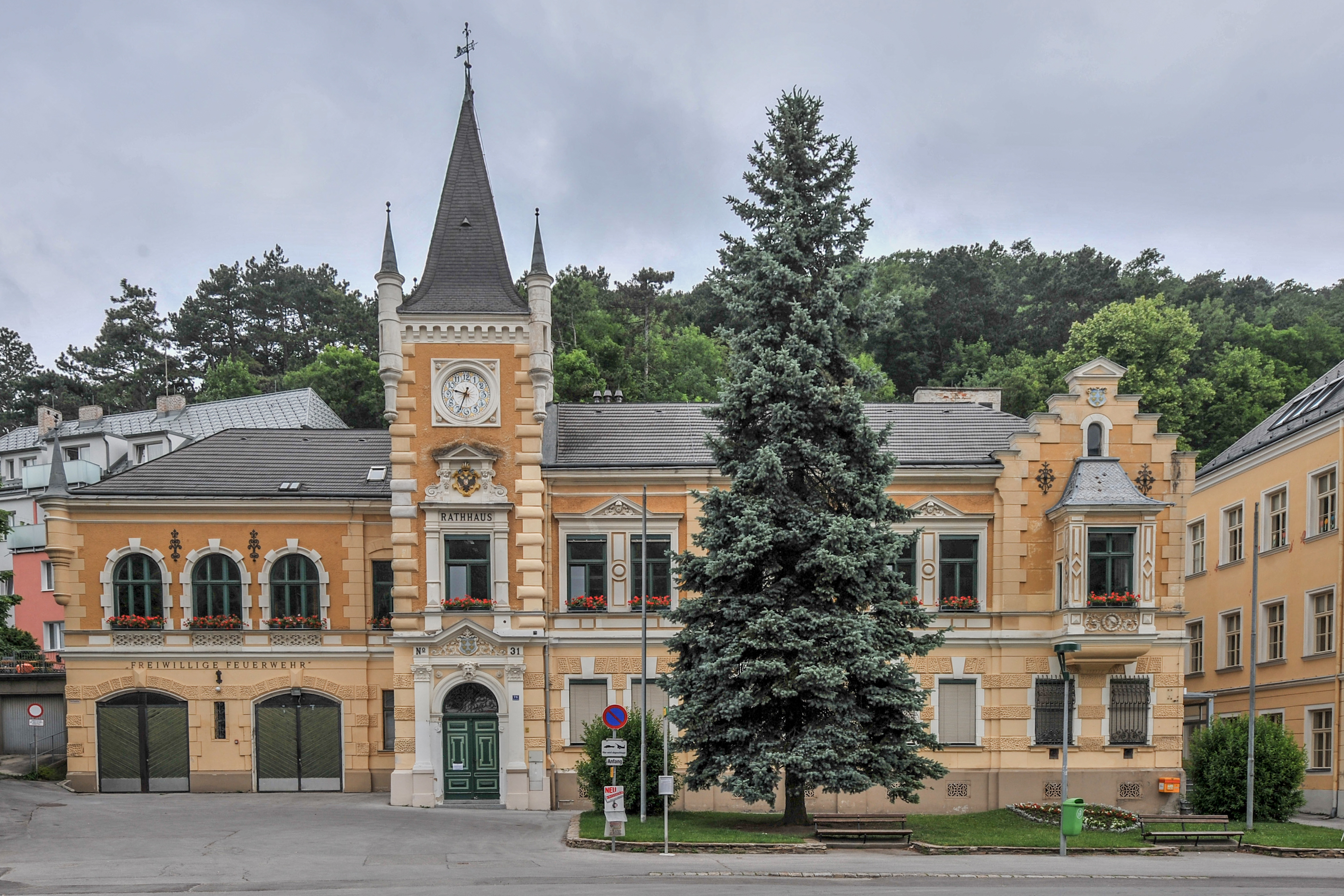
- Town hall

- Coat of arms

- Location within Austria
- Coordinates: 48°7′N 16°11′E
- Country: Austria
- State: Lower Austria
- District: Mödling

Government
  - Mayor: Bernadette Geieregger (ÖVP)

Area
  - Total: 17.51 km^{2} (6.76 sq mi)
- Elevation: 356 m (1,168 ft)

Population (2018-01-01)
  - Total: 3,276
  - Density: 187.1/km^{2} (484.6/sq mi)
- Time zone: UTC+1 (CET)
  - Summer (DST): UTC+2 (CEST)
- Postal code: 2391
- Area code: 02238
- Website: www.kaltenleutgeben.gv.at

Kaltenleutgeben (Central Bavarian: Koidnleitgebn) is a town with a population of 3302 in the district of Mödling in the Austrian state of Lower Austria.

== Geography ==
Kaltenleutgeben is located in the southern Vienna Woods near the industrial district in Lower Austria. More than 73 percent of the area is forested and the town encompasses 17.5 square kilometers. The community borders on the extreme southwest of the city of Vienna and is a popular recreation area for the Viennese population.

== History ==
The parish church of St. James in Kaltenleutgeben was built in 1728-1729 and is a major work of the baroque architect Jakob Oeckhl. He built and financed the building after the death of his second wife because of a vow he made with the birth of his son.

In the 1800s, during the height of the popular Water Cure or Hydropathy (now called hydrotherapy) movement, Kaltenleutgeben was the location of a well-known hydropathic establishment, operated by Wilhelm Winternitz.

Mark Twain lived in Kaltenleutgeben for a half year in 1898. He stayed at the Villa Sonnhof.

== Population ==
Historical population
Year	Pop.	±%
1971	2,520	—
1981	2,552	+1.3%
1991	2,699	+5.8%
2001	2,998	+11.1%
2011	3,357	+12.0%
