= Bernadette Geieregger =

Austrian politician (born 1992)

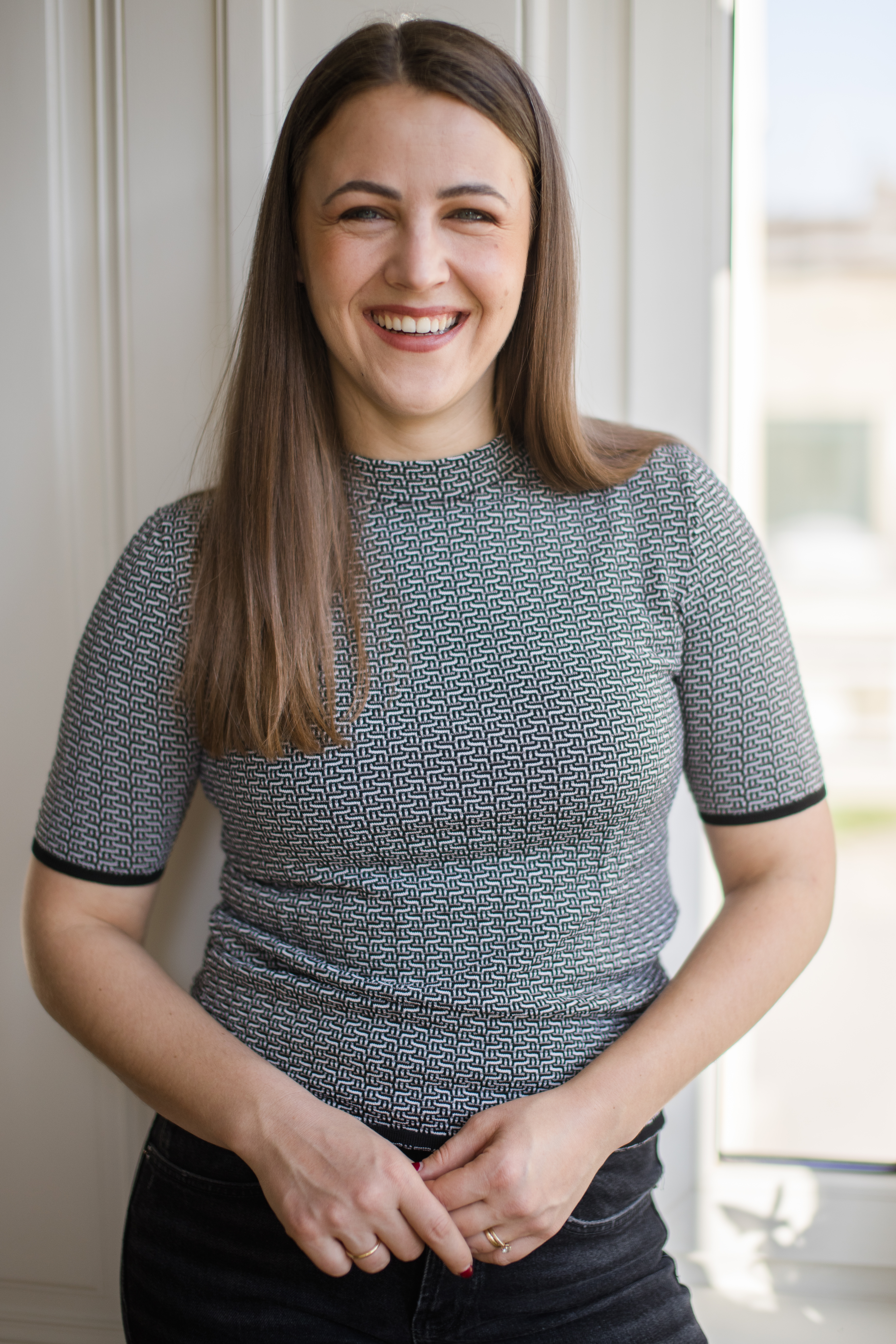
- Geieregger in 2024

Member of the Federal Council
- Incumbent
- Assumed office 21 September 2023
- Appointed by: Landtag of Lower Austria
- Preceded by: Marlene Zeidler-Beck

Personal details
- Born: 30 November 1992 (age 33) Vienna
- Party: Austrian People's Party (since 2008)

Bernadette Geieregger (née Schöny; born 30 November 1992) is an Austrian politician serving as a member of the Federal Council since 2023. She has served as mayor of Kaltenleutgeben since 2020.
