= Laab im Walde =

Laab im Walde Laab im Woid
- Municipality
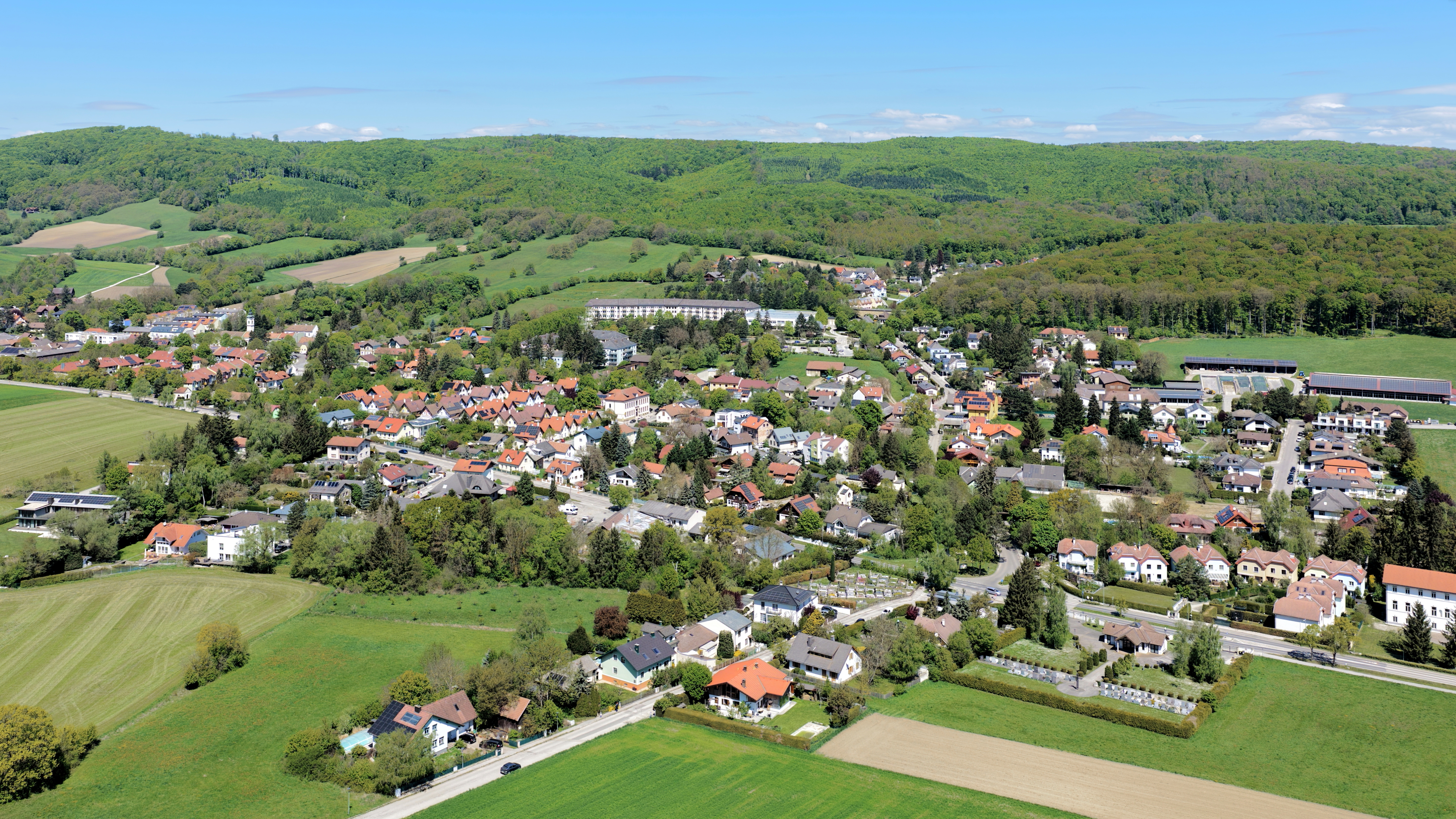
- South view of Laab im Walde

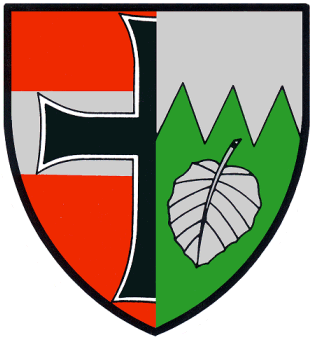
- Coat of arms

- Location within Austria
- Coordinates: 48°9′N 16°10′E
- Country: Austria
- State: Lower Austria
- District: Mödling

Government
  - Mayor: Dr. Peter Klar

Area
  - Total: 7.15 km^{2} (2.76 sq mi)
- Elevation: 316 m (1,037 ft)

Population (2018-01-01)
  - Total: 1,137
  - Density: 159/km^{2} (412/sq mi)
- Time zone: UTC+1 (CET)
  - Summer (DST): UTC+2 (CEST)
- Postal code: 2381
- Area code: 02239
- Website: laab.gv.at

Laab im Walde (Central Bavarian: Laab im Woid) is a town in the district of Mödling in the Austrian state of Lower Austria.

== Population ==
Historical population
Year	Pop.	±%
1971	624	—
1981	615	−1.4%
1991	910	+48.0%
2001	1,144	+25.7%
2011	1,145	+0.1%
