= Wienerwald, Austria =

Wienerwald Weanawoid
- Municipality
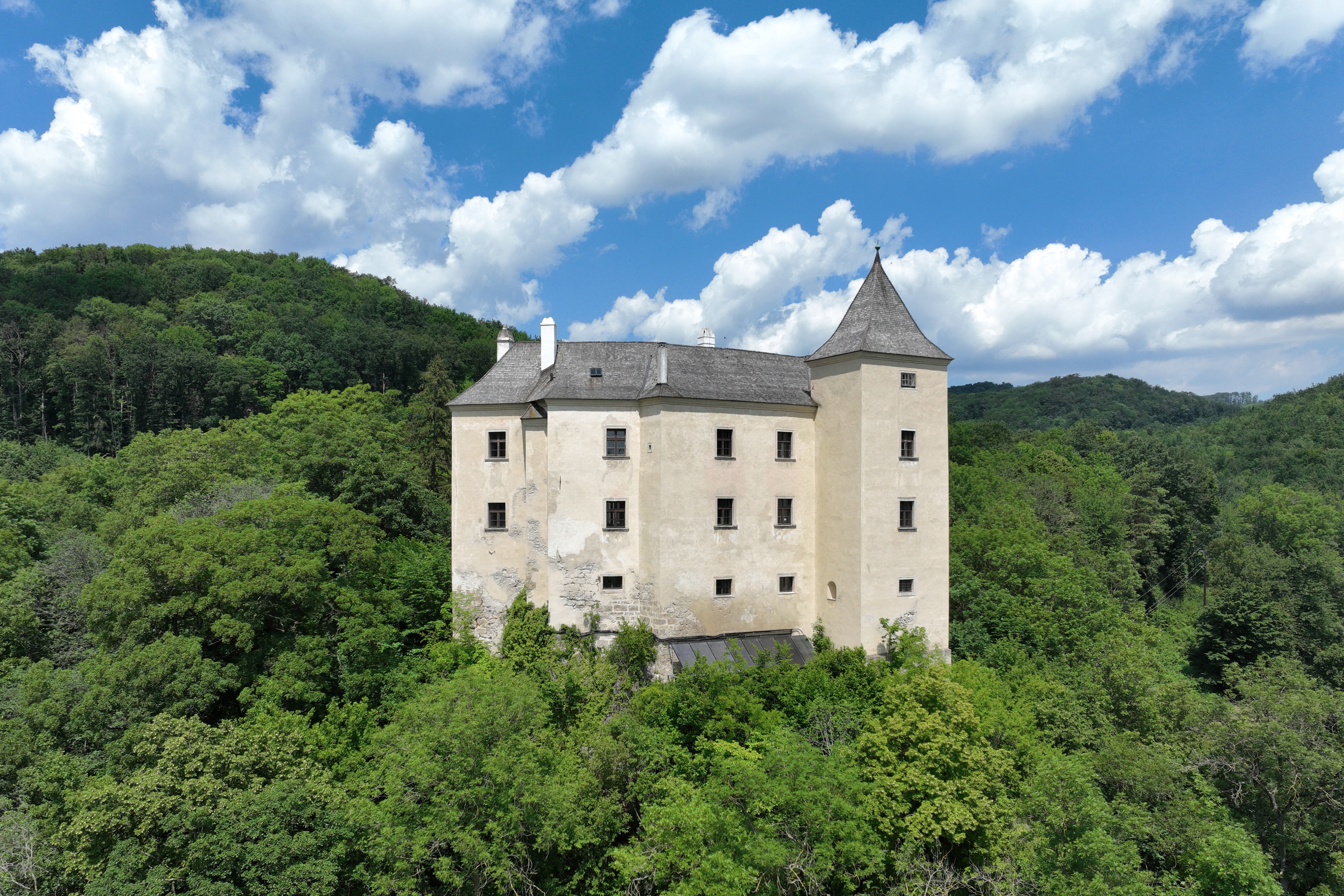
- Wildegg Castle

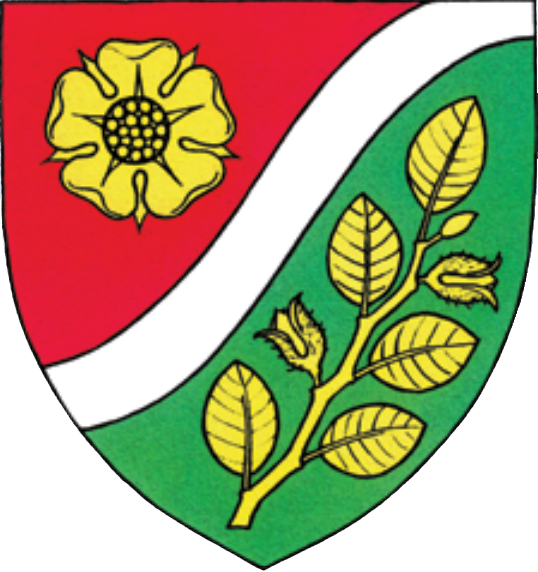
- Coat of arms

- Location within Austria
- Coordinates: 48°6′N 16°8′E
- Country: Austria
- State: Lower Austria
- District: Mödling

Government
  - Mayor: Michael Krischke (ÖVP)

Area
  - Total: 48.17 km^{2} (18.60 sq mi)
- Elevation: 340 m (1,120 ft)

Population (2018-01-01)
  - Total: 2,858
  - Density: 59.33/km^{2} (153.7/sq mi)
- Time zone: UTC+1 (CET)
  - Summer (DST): UTC+2 (CEST)
- Postal code: 2392
- Area code: 02238
- Website: http://www.gemeinde-wienerwald.at/

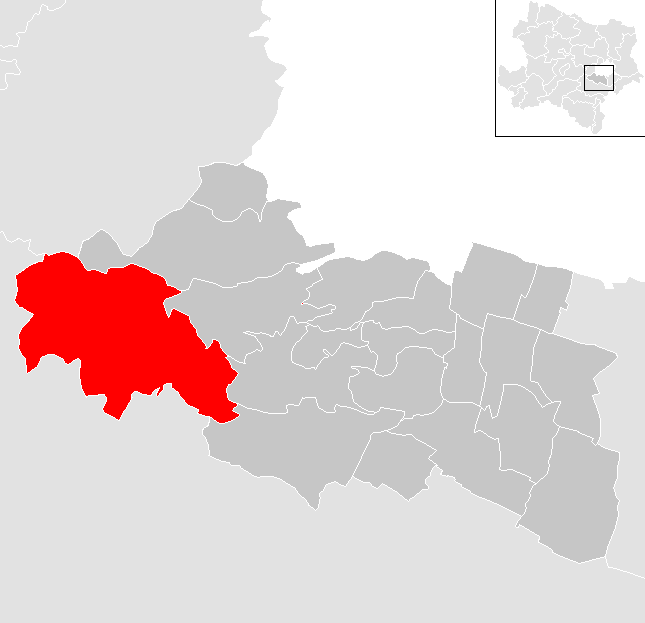
Municipality Wienerwald

Wienerwald (Central Bavarian: Weanawoid) is a municipality in the district of Mödling in the Austrian state of Lower Austria. It is named after the forest Wienerwald.

== Villages ==
- Ameisbühel
- Buchelbach
- Dornbach
- Festleiten
- Grub
- Gruberau
- Lindenhof
- Rohrberg
- Sittendorf
- Stangau
- Sulz im Wienerwald
- Vogelgraben
- Wöglerin

== Population ==
Historical population
Year	Pop.	±%
1971	1,381	—
1981	1,553	+12.5%
1991	1,996	+28.5%
2001	2,409	+20.7%
2011	2,479	+2.9%

== Sights ==
- Wildegg Castle in Sittendorf
