= Maria Enzersdorf =

Maria Enzersdorf Maria Enzasduaf
- Municipality
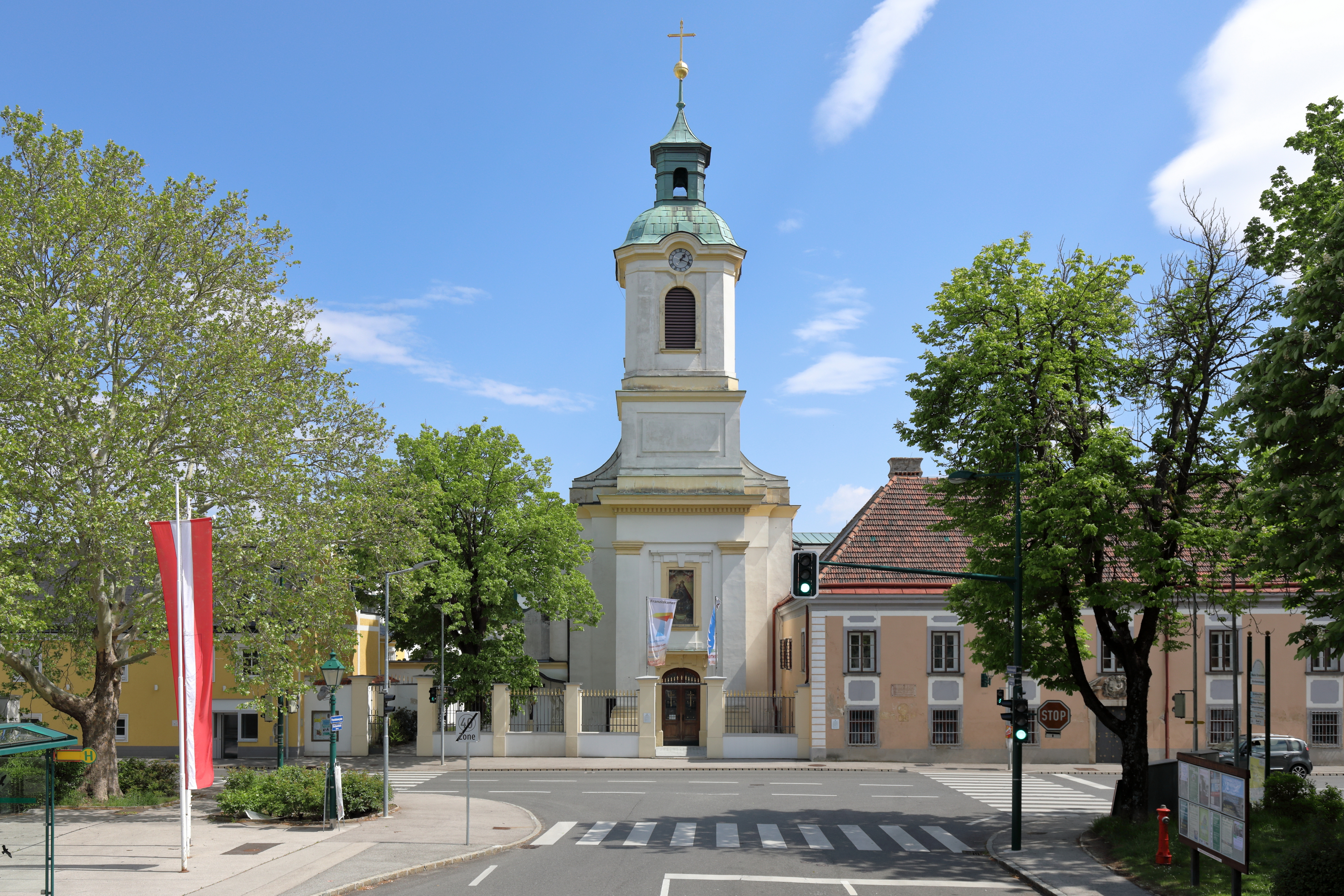

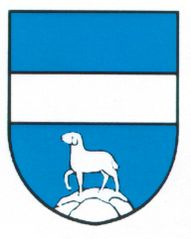
- Coat of arms

- Location within Austria
- Coordinates: 48°6′N 16°17′E
- Country: Austria
- State: Lower Austria
- District: Mödling

Government
  - Mayor: DI Johann Zeiner

Area
  - Total: 5.27 km^{2} (2.03 sq mi)
- Elevation: 225 m (738 ft)

Population (2018-01-01)
  - Total: 8,829
  - Density: 1,680/km^{2} (4,340/sq mi)
- Time zone: UTC+1 (CET)
  - Summer (DST): UTC+2 (CEST)
- Postal code: 2344, 2346
- Area code: 02236
- Website: www.mariaenzersdorf.gv.at

Maria Enzersdorf (Central Bavarian: Maria Enzasduaf) is a small town in the district of Mödling in the Austrian state of Lower Austria.

There are several castles and ruins in the forests surrounding Maria Enzersdorf, including Schloss Liechtenstein, Liechtenstein Castle and the Schwarzer Turm (Black Tower) in the surrounding forest and Schloss Hunyadi in the town itself.

== History ==
Maria Enzersdorf was most likely settled by the Romans and the Celts. It is mentioned for the first time in the 12th century. During this time period was also when Liechtenstein Castle was constructed as a fortress against the Magyars.

The town was destroyed in 1529 and 1683 by the first and second Ottoman sieges.

From 1938 to 1954, the town was part of Vienna's 24th district.

== Population ==
Historical population
Year	Pop.	±%
1961	3,825	—
1971	8,120	+112.3%
1981	9,148	+12.7%
1991	8,594	−6.1%
2001	8,202	−4.6%
2011	8,718	+6.3%

== Economy ==
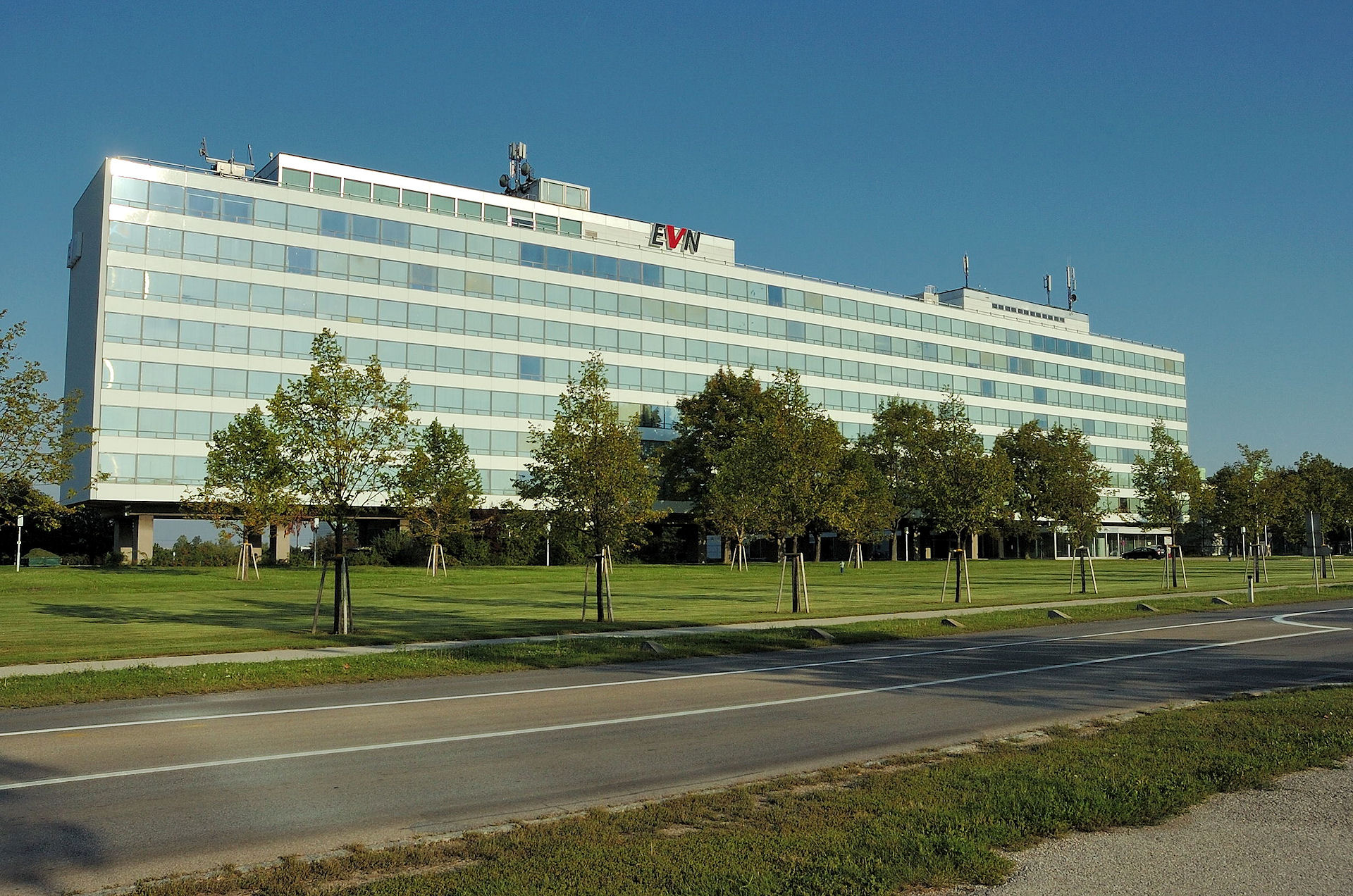
EVN Group Headquarters

The town is the location of the headquarters of the energy company EVN Group.
