= Biedermannsdorf =

Biedermannsdorf Biedamaunsduaf
- Municipality
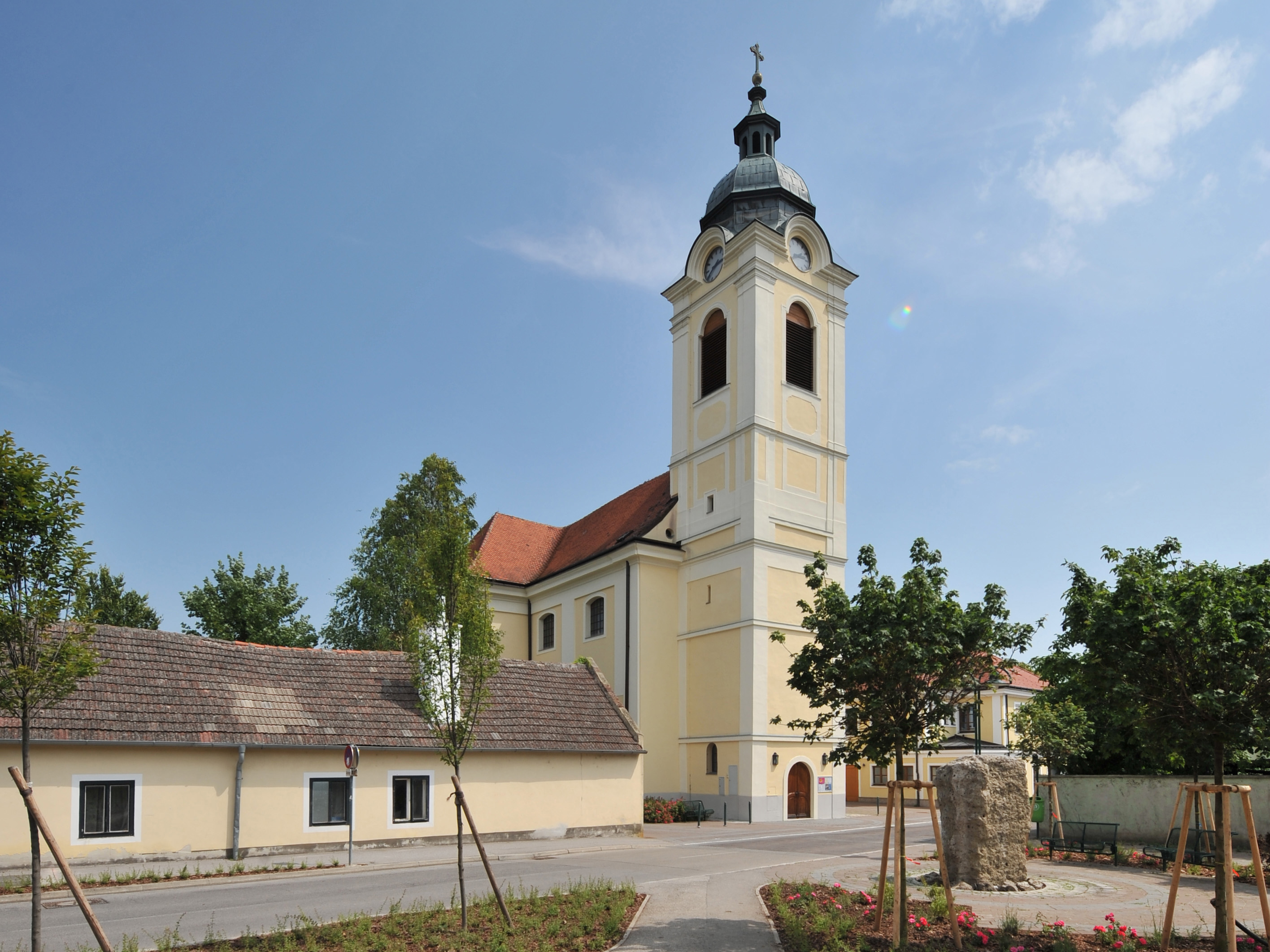
- Catholic church in Biedermannsdorf

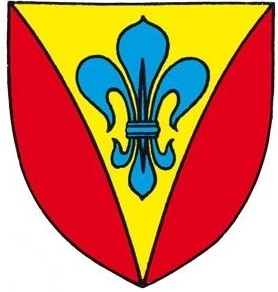
- Coat of arms

- Location within Austria
- Coordinates: 48°5′N 16°20′E
- Country: Austria
- State: Lower Austria
- District: Mödling

Government
  - Mayor: Beatrix Dalos

Area
  - Total: 8.95 km^{2} (3.46 sq mi)
- Elevation: 185 m (607 ft)

Population (2018-01-01)
  - Total: 2,988
  - Density: 334/km^{2} (865/sq mi)
- Time zone: UTC+1 (CET)
  - Summer (DST): UTC+2 (CEST)
- Postal code: 2362
- Area code: 02236
- Website: www.biedermannsdorf.at

Biedermannsdorf (German pronunciation: [ˈbiːdɐmansˌdɔʁf]; Central Bavarian: Biedamaunsduaf) is a town in the district of Mödling in the Austrian state of Lower Austria.

== Geography ==
The municipality lies in the Vienna basin east of the A2 Autobahn. The Laxenburg-Biedermannsdorf train station lies on the south side of the municipality, and the Vienna–Pottendorf–Neustadt line runs through the east end.

The Mödlingbach runs through the municipality.

== History ==
The first settlement in the area was made around 7000 BCE, and archaeological evidence has been found dating back to 5000 BCE.

In Roman times, Biedermannsdorf, belonged to the district of Vindobona. In 1999–2000, remains of a road station from the first centuries CE were discovered.

The first mention of the place in historical records dates from 1170/80, at which time it belonged to the Liechtenstein and Perchtoldsdorf families.

Like all municipalities in the area, Biedermannsdorf suffered under the wars of religion, the Turkish occupation, and the plague. In 1797, the Vienna-Neustadt Canal was built with a branch leading to the brickyards in Bedermannsdorf.

The area was bombed in World War II because the Ostmark airplane factory was nearby. The municipality was incorporated into Greater Vienna from 1938 to 1954, after which it again became an independent municipality.

== Population ==
Historical population
Year	Pop.	±%
1971	1,295	—
1981	1,859	+43.6%
1991	2,668	+43.5%
2001	2,904	+8.8%
2011	2,859	−1.5%
