= Mödling District =

Coordinates: 48.095°N 16.239°E

Mödling District Bezirk Mödling
- District
- Country: Austria
- State: Lower Austria
- Number of municipalities: 20
- Administrative seat: Mödling

Government
  - District Governor: Philipp Enzinger

Area
  - Total: 277.0 km^{2} (107.0 sq mi)

Population (2024)
  - Total: 121,039
  - Density: 437.0/km^{2} (1,132/sq mi)
- Time zone: UTC+01:00 (CET)
  - Summer (DST): UTC+02:00 (CEST)
- Telephone prefix: 2236
- Vehicle registration: MD
- NUTS code: AT127
- District code: 317

Bezirk Mödling is a district of the state of Lower Austria in Austria.

== Municipalities ==
Suburbs, hamlets and other subdivisions of a municipality are indicated in small characters.

- Achau
- Biedermannsdorf
- Breitenfurt bei Wien
- Brunn am Gebirge
- Gaaden
- Gießhübl
- Gumpoldskirchen
- Guntramsdorf
- Hennersdorf bei Wien
- Hinterbrühl
  - Hinterbrühl, Sparbach, Weissenbach bei Mödling, Wassergspreng
- Kaltenleutgeben
- Laab im Walde
- Laxenburg
- Maria Enzersdorf
- Mödling
- Münchendorf
- Perchtoldsdorf
- Vösendorf
- Wiener Neudorf
- Wienerwald
  - Dornbach, Grub, Gruberau, Sittendorf, Stangau, Sulz im Wienerwald, Wöglerin
