= Guntramsdorf =

- Municipality
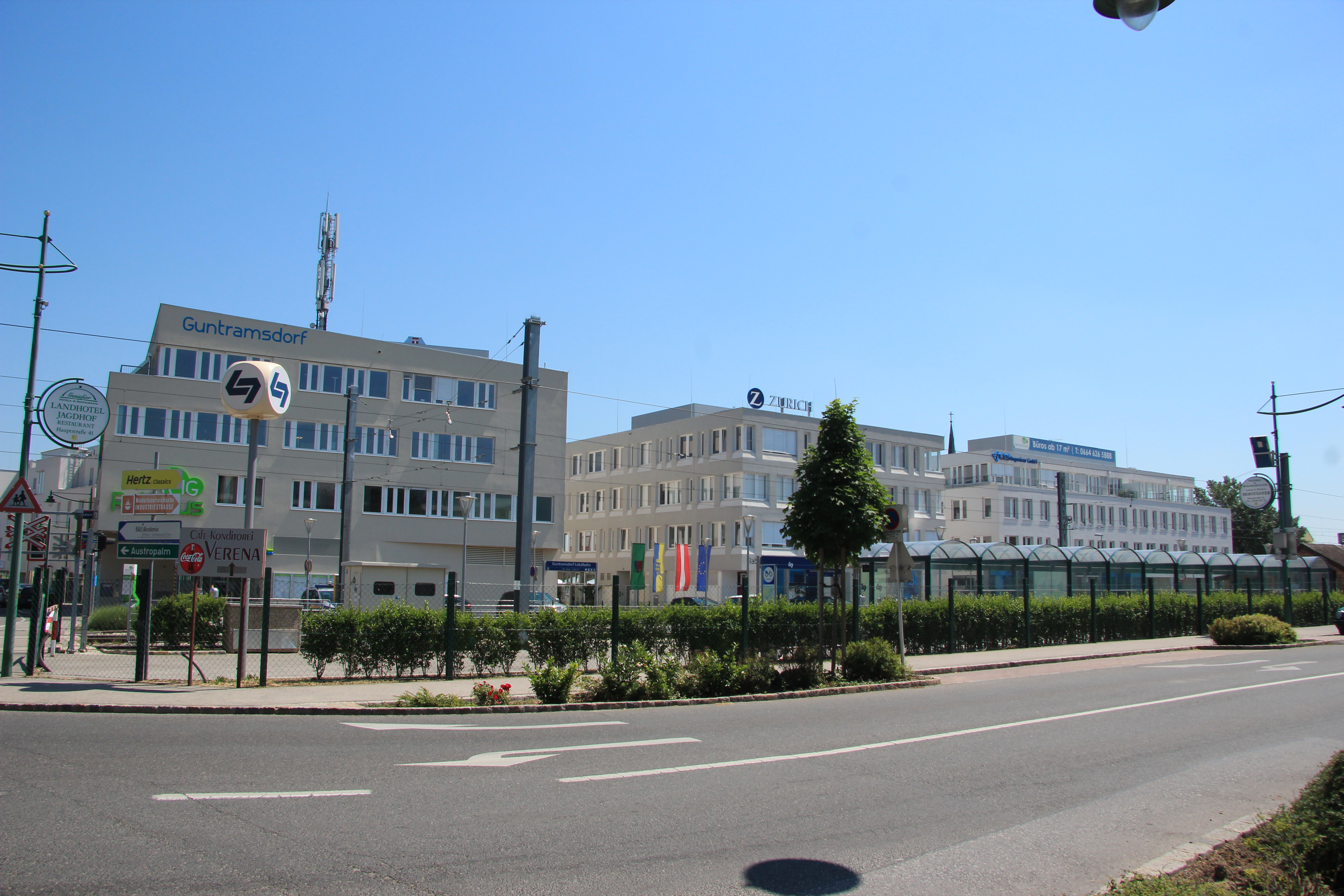
- Street in Guntramsdorf

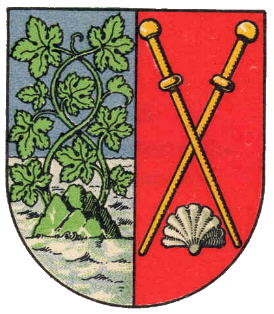
- Coat of arms

- Location within Austria
- Coordinates: 48°3′N 16°19′E
- Country: Austria
- State: Lower Austria
- District: Mödling

Government
  - Mayor: Robert Weber

Area
  - Total: 14.86 km^{2} (5.74 sq mi)
- Elevation: 193 m (633 ft)

Population (2018-01-01)
  - Total: 9,179
  - Density: 617.7/km^{2} (1,600/sq mi)
- Time zone: UTC+1 (CET)
  - Summer (DST): UTC+2 (CEST)
- Postal code: 2353
- Area code: 02236
- Website: www.guntramsdorf.at

Guntramsdorf is a town in the district of Mödling in the Austrian state of Lower Austria. As part of the "Industrieviertel", the industrial region in the southeast of Lower Austria, it is well connected to the country capital Vienna. The local rail service Badner Bahn connects Guntramsdorf with the central district of Vienna in the north and popular spa resort destination Baden bei Wien in the south. In the west of the town lies the Vienna Woods, an outlier of the Alpine foothills, featuring recreational forest areas and hiking trails, and the southeast of Guntramsdorf extends into the thermal Vienna Basin.

== History ==
From the 1st to the 4th century the area was a part of the Roman province of Pannonia.

First documented mention of the town's likely founder, Count Guntram, dates back to 859, when Count Kozel gifted lands to the monastery of Regensburg and Count Guntram's name appears being listed for giving testimony.

After the Anschluss of Austria by Nazi Germany in 1938, Guntramsdorf became a part of Greater Vienna, only to regain its status as part of Lower Austria in 1954.

== Population ==
Historical population
Year	Pop.	±%
1971	6,017	—
1981	6,090	+1.2%
1991	6,977	+14.6%
2001	8,421	+20.7%
2011	8,955	+6.3%
