= Church of Luther, Riga =

Church building in Riga, Latvia

Church of Luther
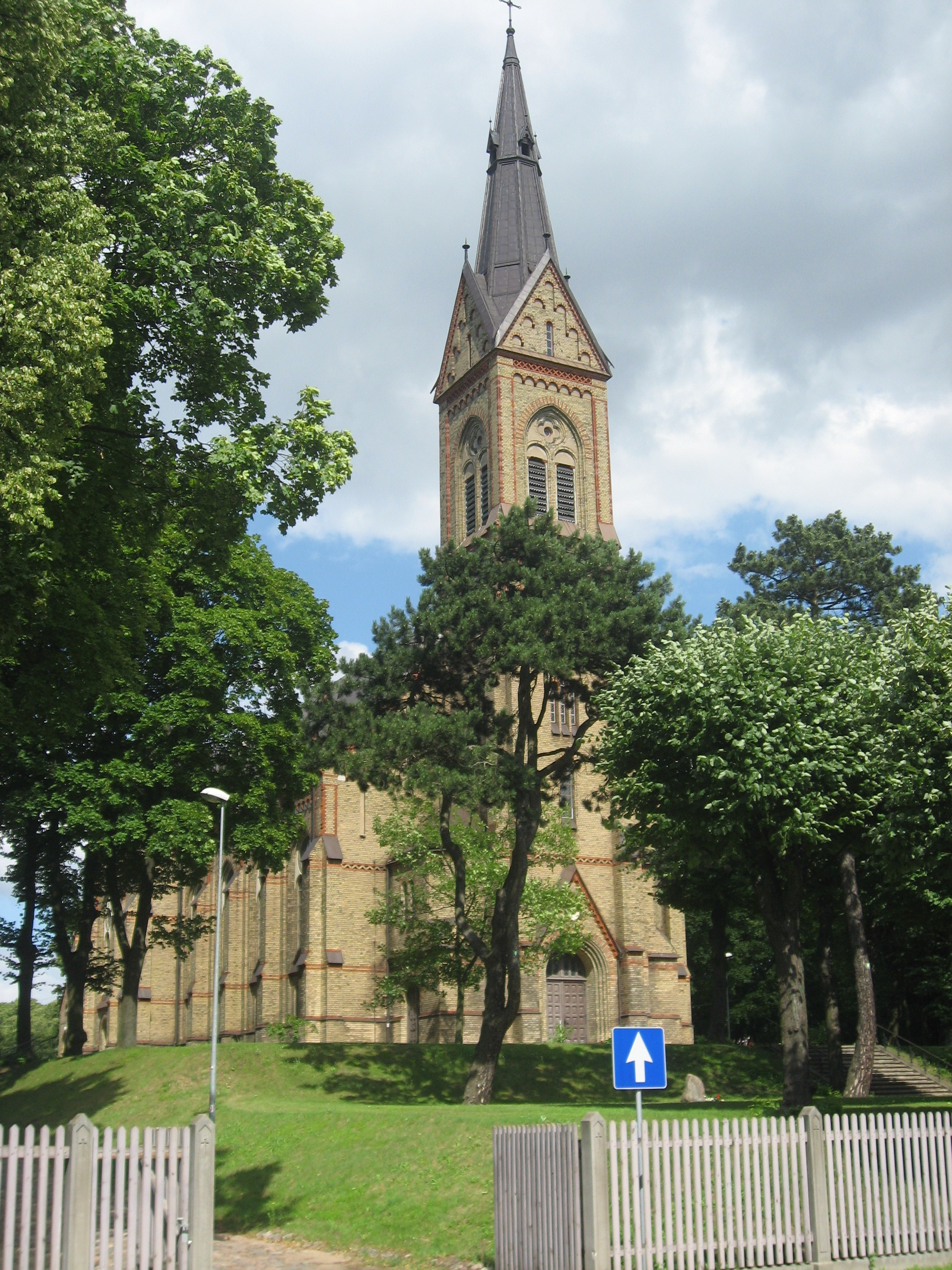

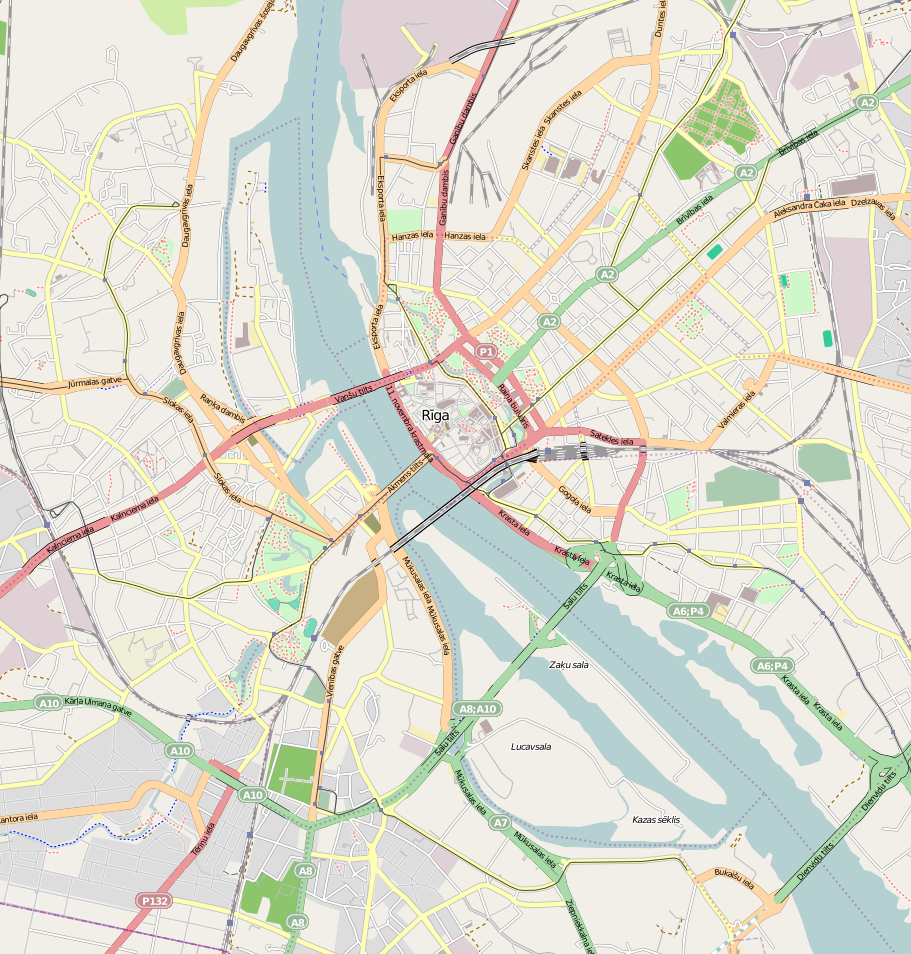
- Location within Riga
- 56°55′42.98″N 24°5′13.48″E
- Location: Riga
- Country: Latvia
- Denomination: Lutheran

Architecture
- Architect: Johann von Koch

Church of Luther (Latvian: Lutera evaņģēliski luteriskā baznīca), or Torņakalns Church (Latvian: Torņakalna baznīca) after its geographical location in Torņakalns, is a Lutheran church in Riga, the capital of Latvia. It is a parish church of the Evangelical Lutheran Church of Latvia. The church is situated at the address 3/5 Torņakalns Street.

== Architecture ==
It is built in the traditional neo-gothic architectural style, with soaring arches, a tall spire, and a traditional cruciform shape. It is noted for its massive iron chandeliers.

The Riga Luther Church was built according to the design of Johann von Koch and is the first church in Latvia named after Luther. The church was consecrated on February 24, 1891. Riga Luther Church is a traditional Neo-Gothic building with a pointed tower at the western end, a distinct Latin cross layout, an extended chancel, and a trapezoidal apse. The façades of the church alternate between niches, window openings, and cornices inspired by Gothic architecture, and rosettes and arches borrowed from Romantic-style buildings. The yellowish walls are given visual richness by the rhythmic arrangement of small plastered sections, as well as the decoration of portals, windows, and corners with red brick bands.

The church interior was designed by Wilhelm Bockslaff, a notable expert in the application of Gothic style. The key interior elements — the pulpit and choir stalls — are well balanced with the overall atmosphere of the building. The church seats 1,000 people and has standing room for 250. One particularly unique feature of the church is its massive wrought-iron chandeliers. Two years after the church was consecrated — in 1893 — the company E. F. Walcker & Co. from Ludwigsburg built an organ there.
