= Johann von Koch =

German architect (1850–1915)

Johann Koch
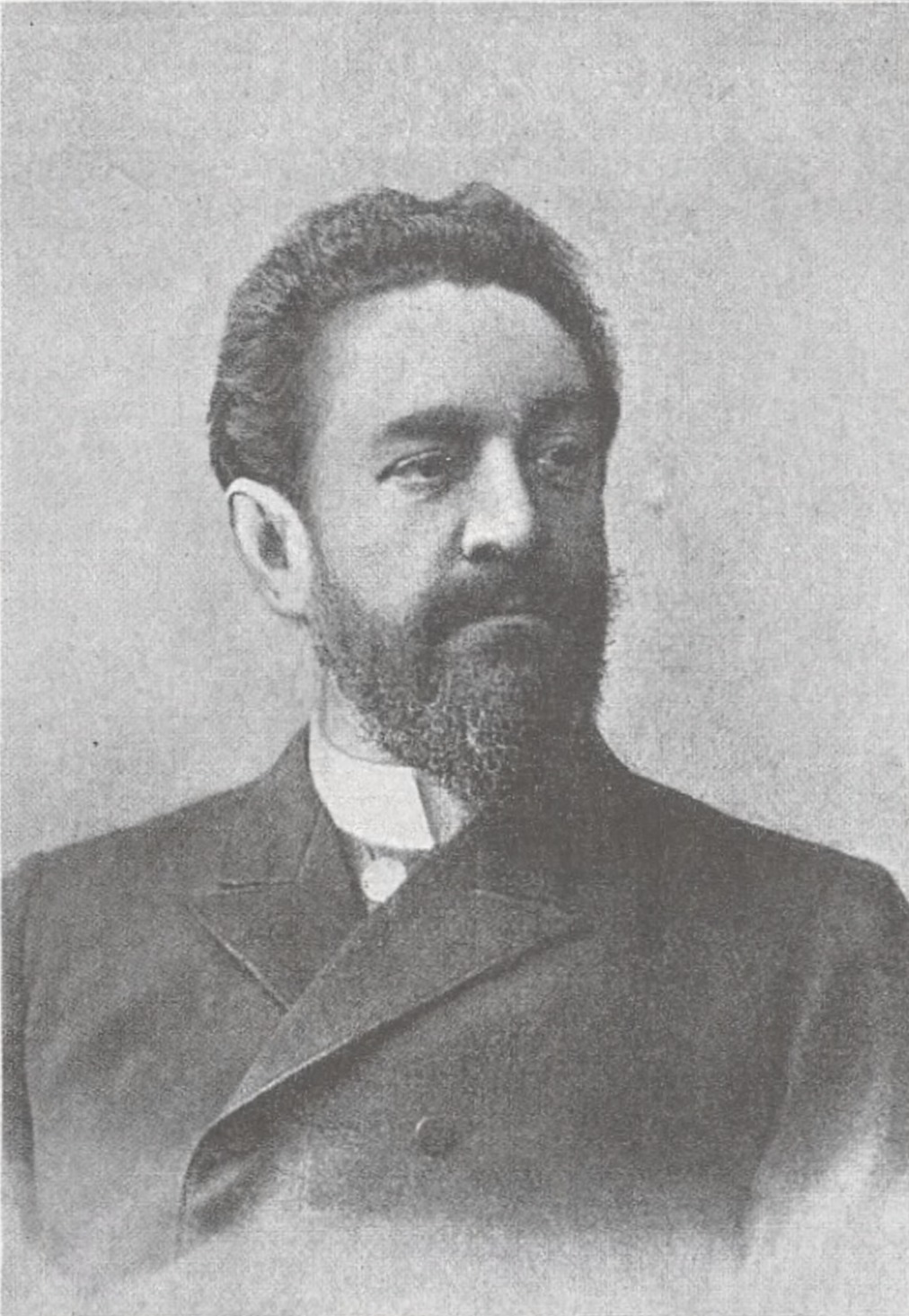
- Born: Johann von Koch; 4 September 1850; Ebmeth, Bohemia, Austrian Empire
- Died: 12 March 1915 (aged 64); Karlovy Vary, Bohemia, Austria-Hungary
- Education: Prague Polytechnic
- Known for: Architecture
- Movement: Historicism

Johann von Koch (4 September 1850 – 12 March 1915) was a German architect and professor. He was the author of numerous public buildings in Riga, Latvia. His work, influenced heavily by Italian Renaissance architecture, represents a significant contribution to the historicist movement in Central and Eastern Europe during the late 19th century.

Johann von Koch's architecture is notable for its adherence to Italian Renaissance idioms, often citing specific Venetian sources. His style stood in contrast to the more eclectic and flexible historicism of contemporaries like Stephan Tragl.

== Early life and education ==
Johann von Koch was born in the village of Ebmeth (today Rovná) in Bohemia, then part of the Austrian Empire. His father, Wenzel Koch (1812–1888) worked as a conservation officer and forester in the service of the noble Auersperg family. When Johann was still very young, his father obtained a new job and the family relocated to Karlovy Vary, where Johann also received his basic education.

Koch attended the secondary school in Jáchymov from where he graduated in 1867. He later studied mechanical engineering at the Prague Polytechnic in the winter semester of 1867/68, though he soon transitioned to architecture. He became a member of the student association Corps Frankonia Prag in 1867. Upon the advice of professor Alois von Brinz, he continued his studies in Munich, where he also joined Corps Suevia München, and later completed further studies in Vienna under Friedrich von Schmidt and Theophil von Hansen.

== Academic and architectural career ==
After completing his studies and military service, Koch began working as an architect in Karlovy Vary and later Prague. He became assistant to Josef Zítek at the German department of architecture at the Prague Polytechnic, eventually lecturing on art history, with a focus on the Renaissance. In 1883, he was appointed professor.

During this period, Koch contributed to a number of architectural competitions and commissions in Bohemia. Notably, he co-designed the Morzin Palace in Benešov nad Ploučnicí (1878) for Countess Aloisie Czernin-Morzinová. His additions, designed to match the older Saxon Renaissance style of the estate, were so seamlessly integrated that they appeared original. That same year, he worked alongside Antonín Goller on renovations to the Vrchlabí Castle complex, designing the gardener's house, gatehouse, and greenhouse in neo-Gothic and neo-Renaissance styles.

Despite his active participation in competitions—such as his third-prize-winning entry for the National Museum in Prague in 1884—many of Koch's designs in Bohemia remained unrealized.

=== Move to Riga ===
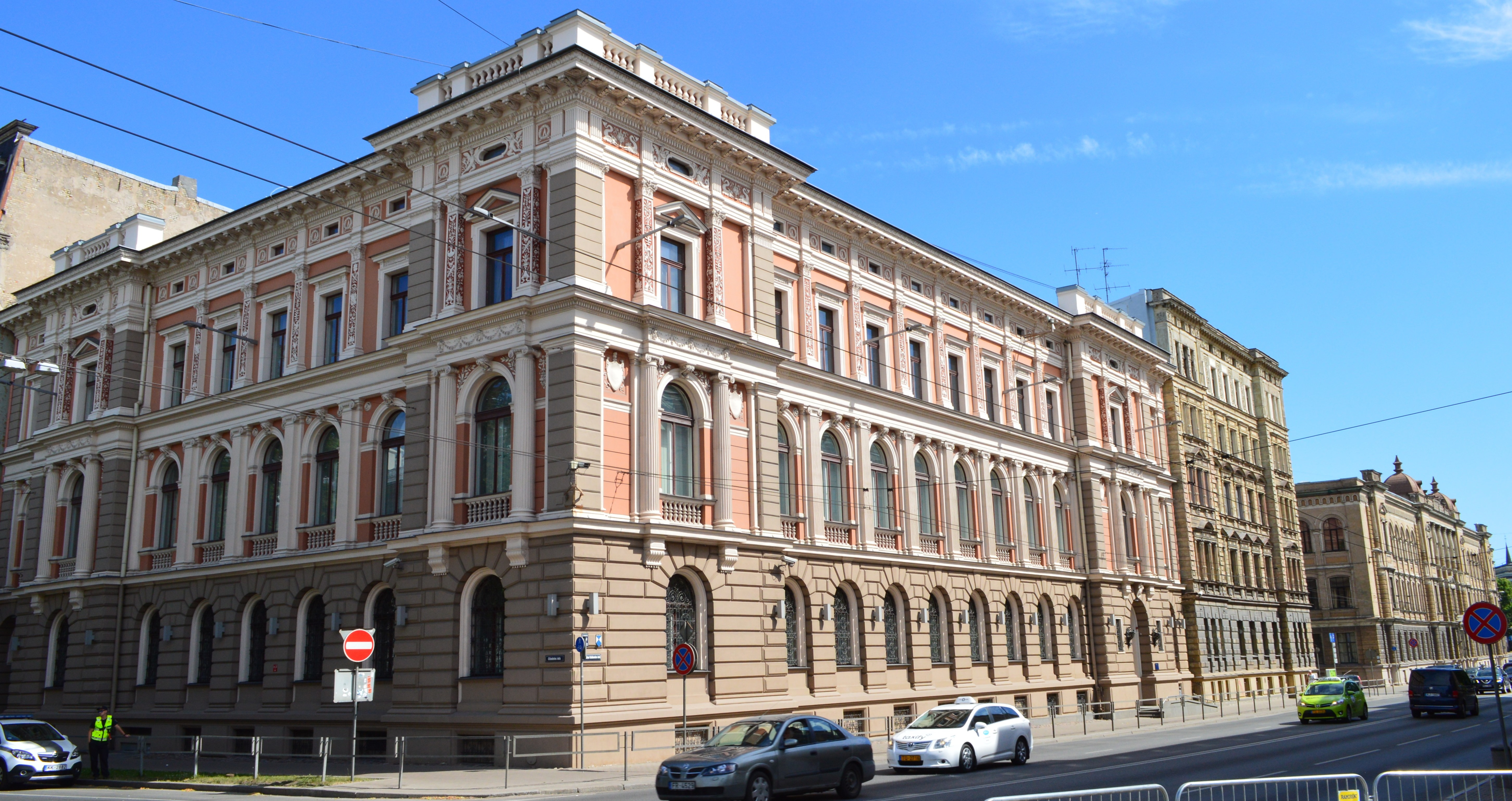
Latvian Credit Association Bank (1886–1889), Krišjāņa Valdemāra street 1B, Riga

In 1884, Johann von Koch accepted a professorship in architecture at the Polytechnic Institute of Riga. He became dean in 1887, a position he held until 1905. In 1893/94, he was also a member of the commission of the Ministry of Public Enlightenment in Saint Petersburg for the reorganization of the Riga Polytechnic. After the Russification of the university, he was one of the few professors who were allowed to continue teaching in German. Koch played a pivotal role in the education of Baltic architects and maintained active collaborations with his students, and in 1890 he became a member of the Society for the Promotion of German Science, Art and Literature in Bohemia and according to his design a monument to the doctor Gallus von Hochberger (1803–1901) was built in Karlovy Vary.

== Works ==
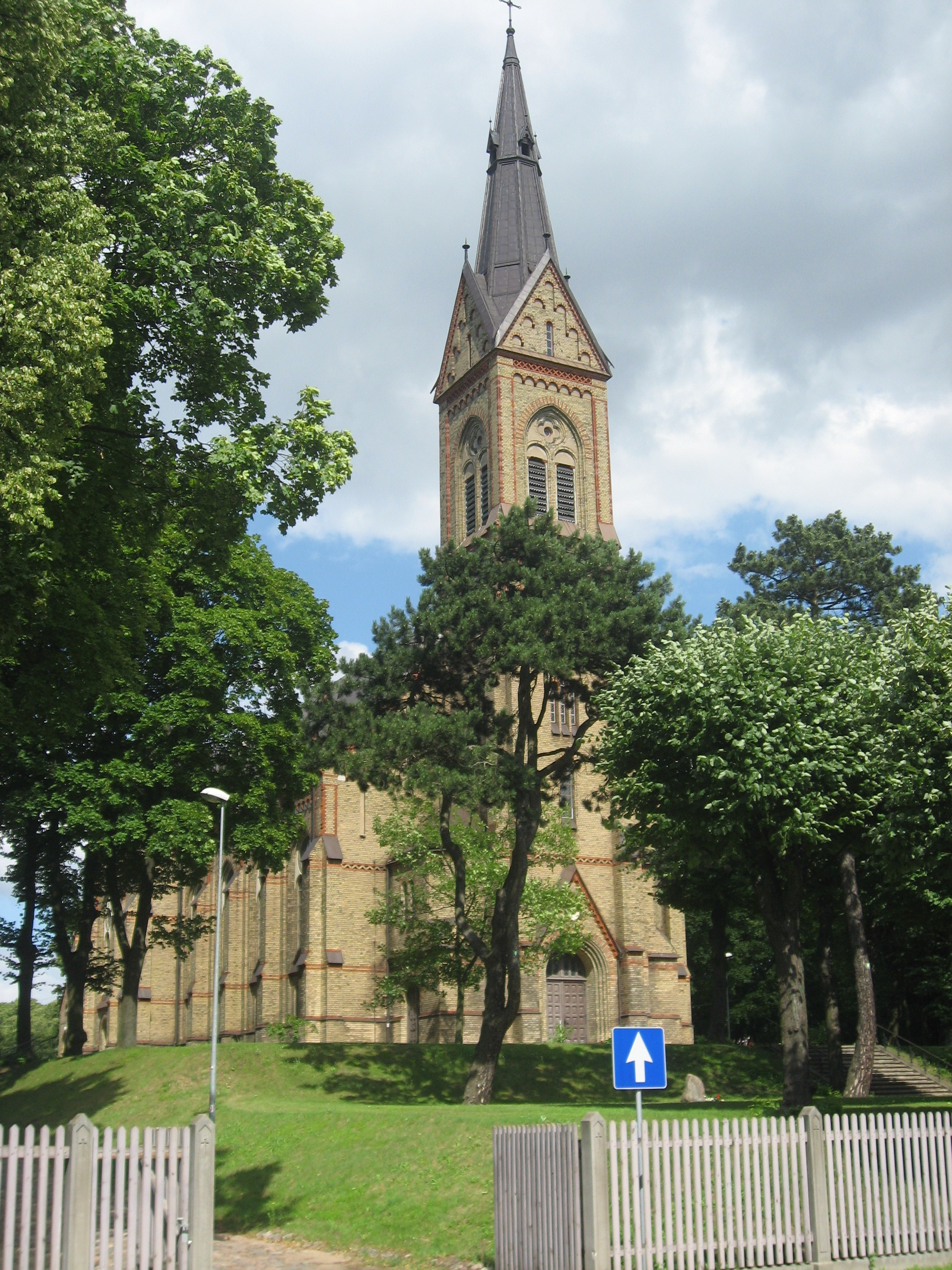
Church of Luther, Riga, Torņakalns

His key architectural contributions include:

- Residential and guest house in Karlovy Vary, Zahradní 803/27, around 1873, in the Neo-Renaissance style, now a hotel.
- Latvian Credit Association Bank (1886–1889) – A grand neo-Renaissance palace inspired by Venetian architecture, particularly Jacopo Sansovino.
- Church of Luther, Riga, Torņakalns (1888–1891) – A red brick neo-Gothic church with an open timber ceiling and minimal exterior buttressing.
- Villa of Banker Paul Alexander Schwarz (1889–1891) – Another Venetian Renaissance-inspired residence with lavish stucco and heraldic decoration.
- Faculty of Biology, Riga Polytechnic (completed 1901) – A restrained Renaissance-style academic building influenced by Gottfried Semper's Zurich Polytechnic.

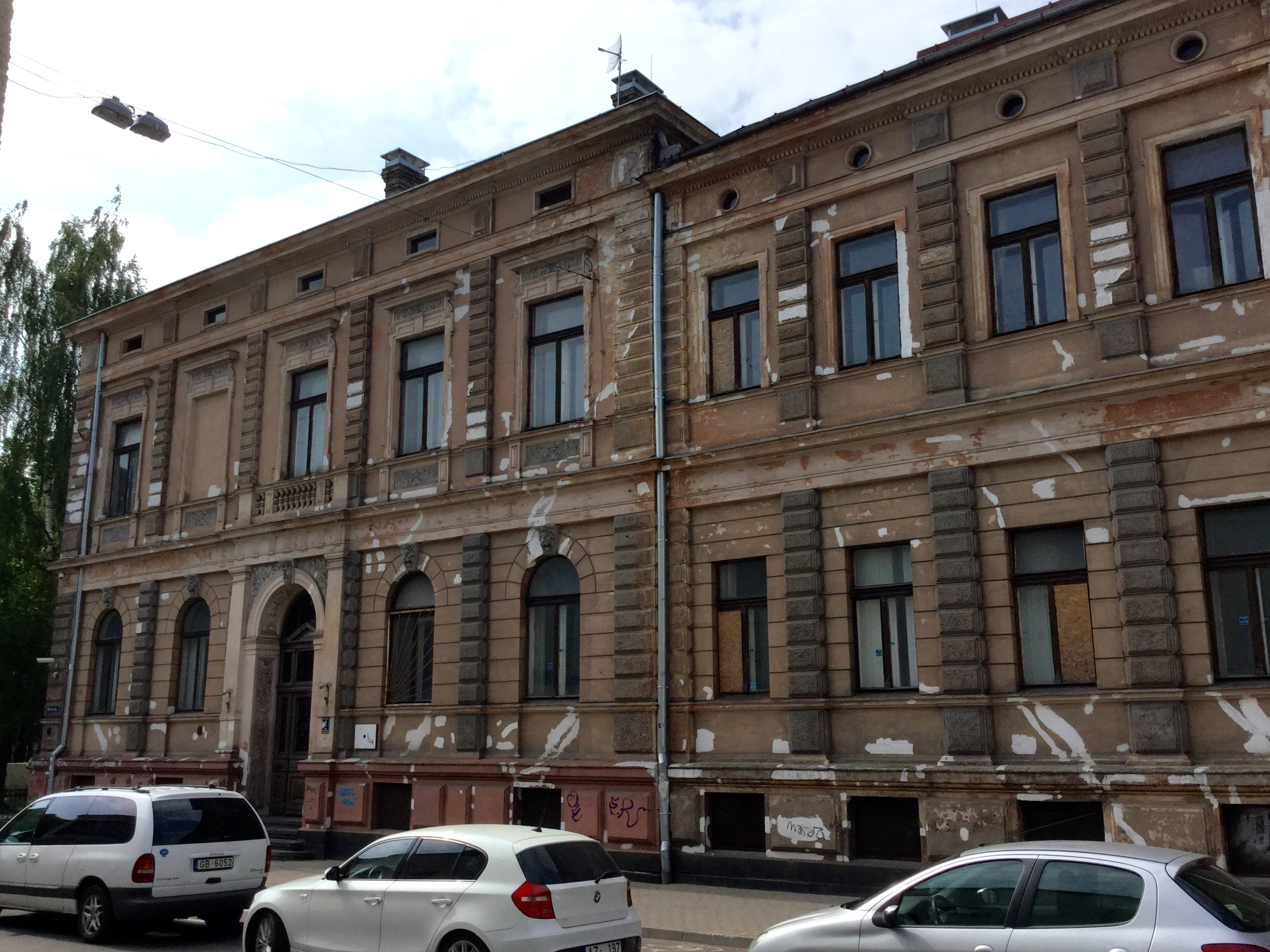
Villa of Banker Paul Alexander Schwarz, Skolas street 1, Riga

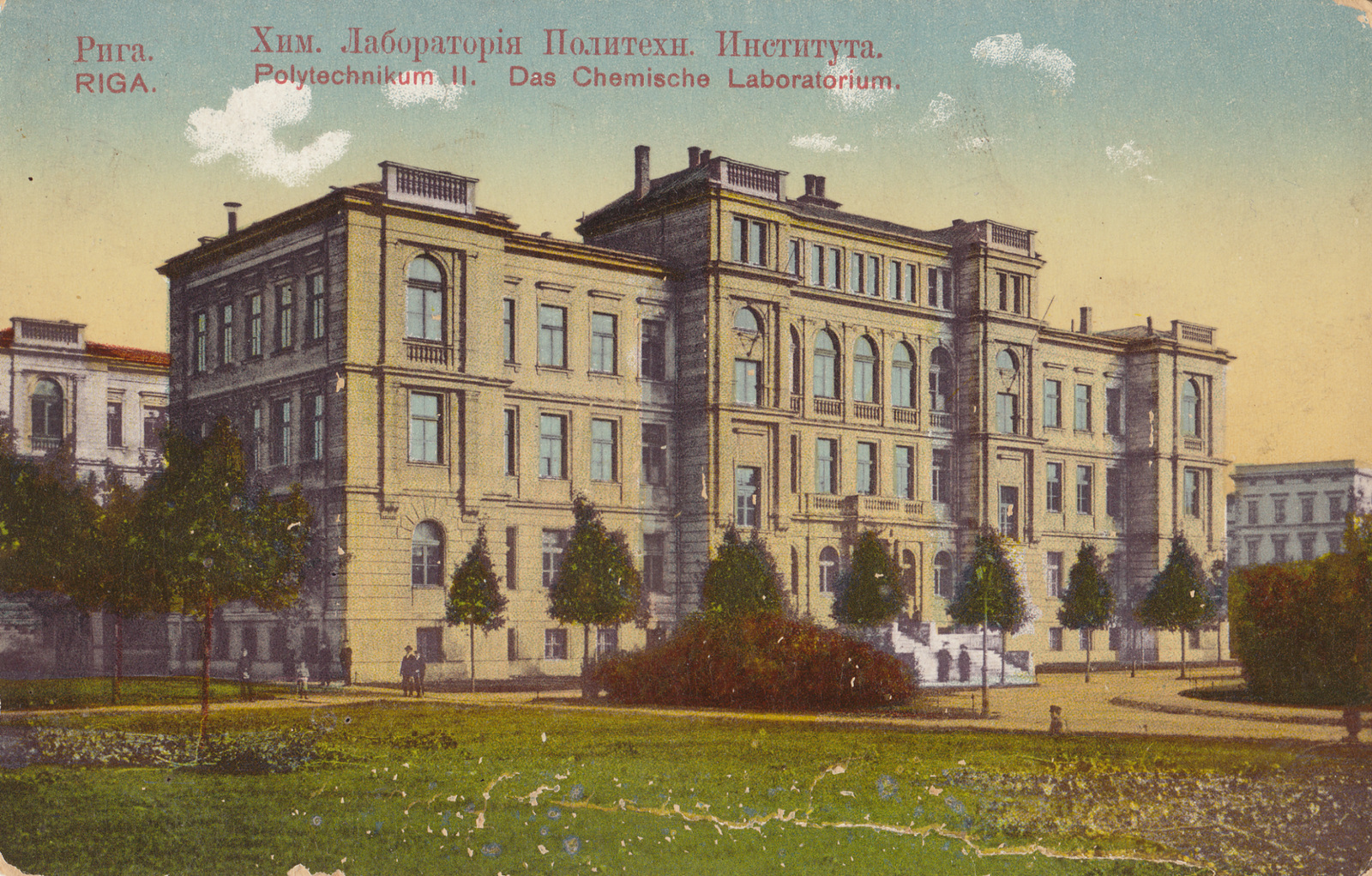
Faculty of Biology, Riga Polytechnic (completed 1901), Kronvalda bulvāris 4, Riga

Koch was widely respected in Riga not only for his teaching but also for his refined classicist style. His architectural approach was characterized by formal clarity, symmetry, and a commitment to classical principles, particularly Italian Renaissance precedents.

=== Gallery ===
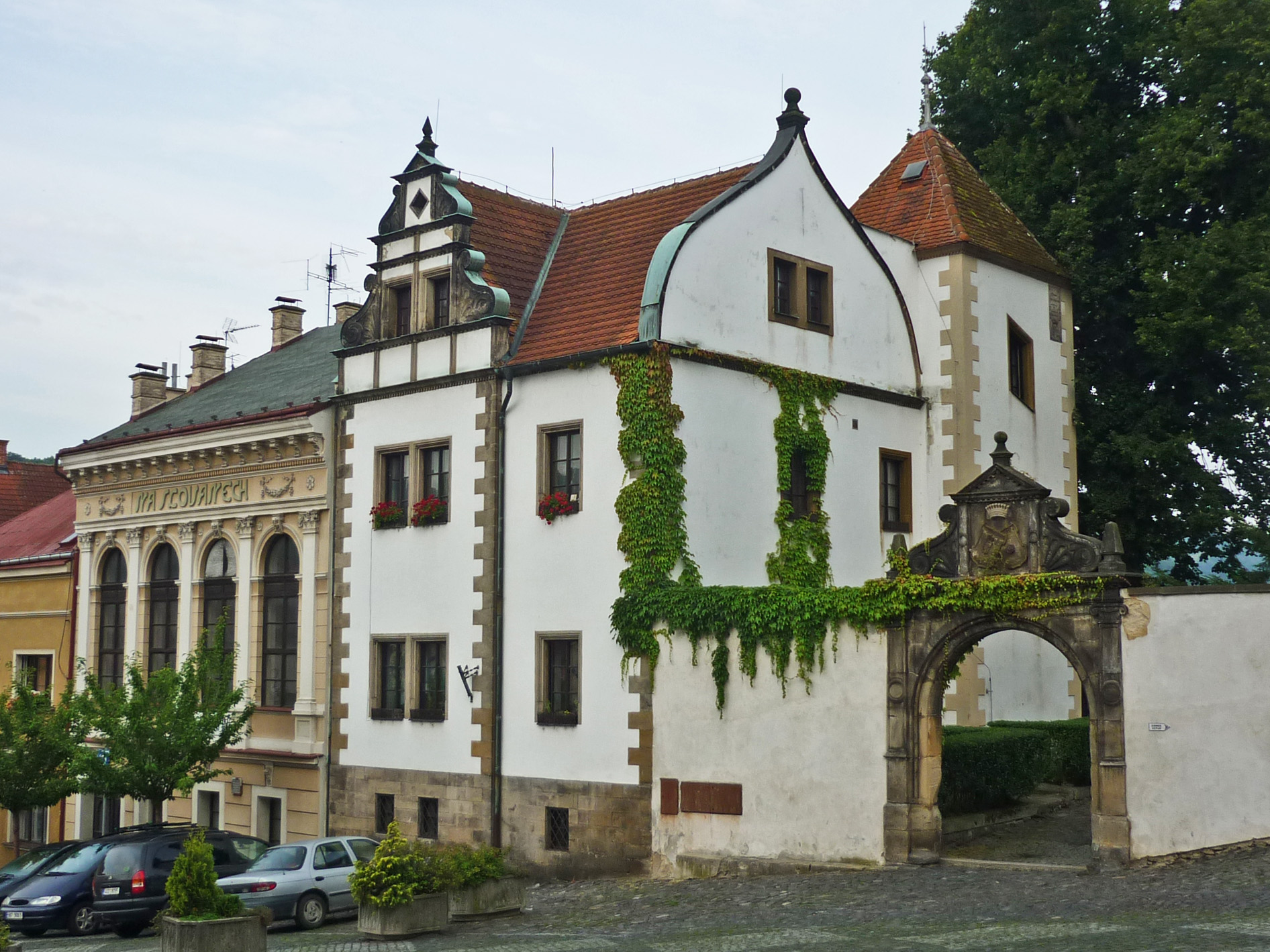
Lower Castle, so-called Morzin Castle, in Benešov nad Ploučnicí

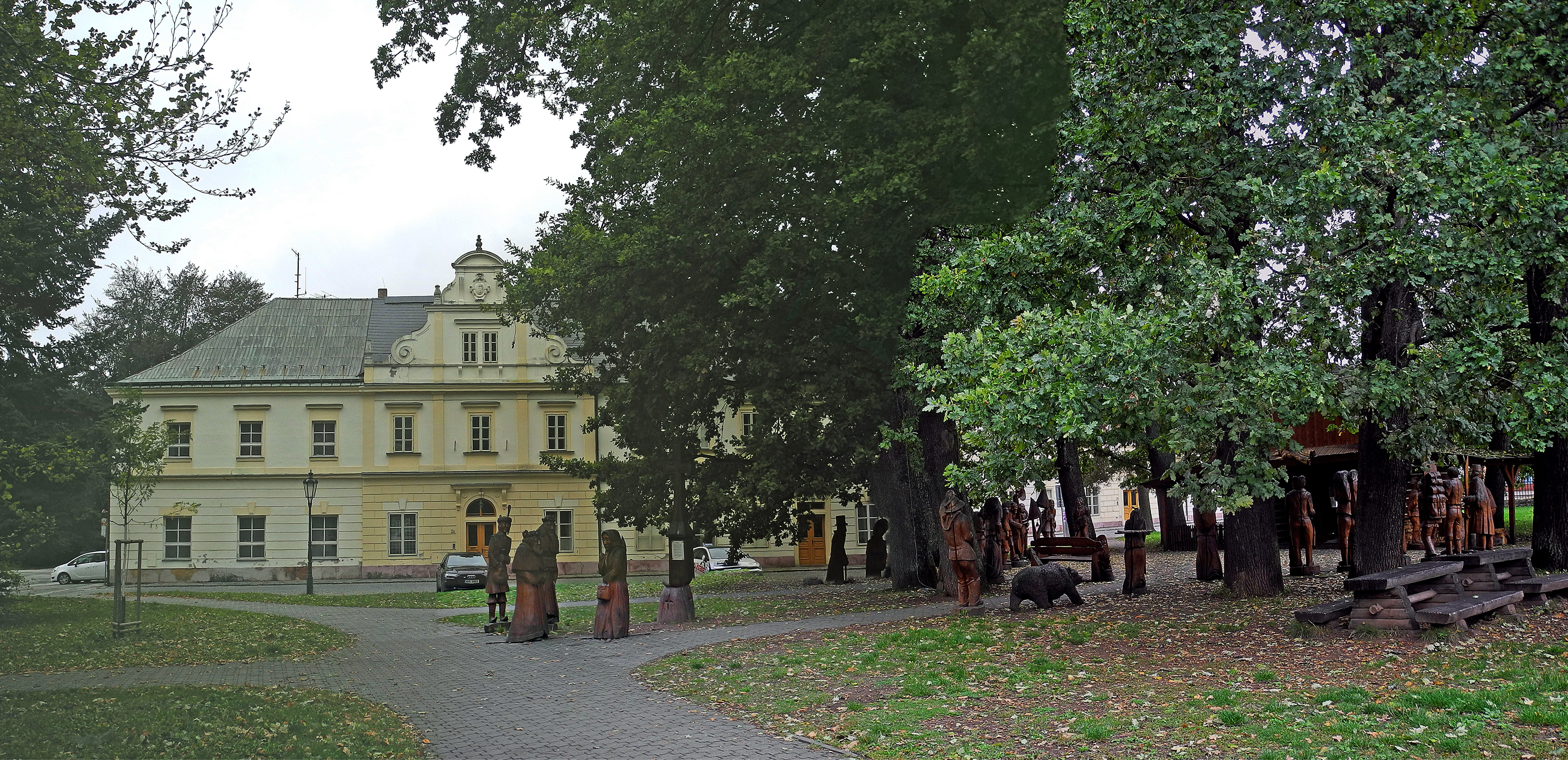
Administrative building at Vrchlabí Castle

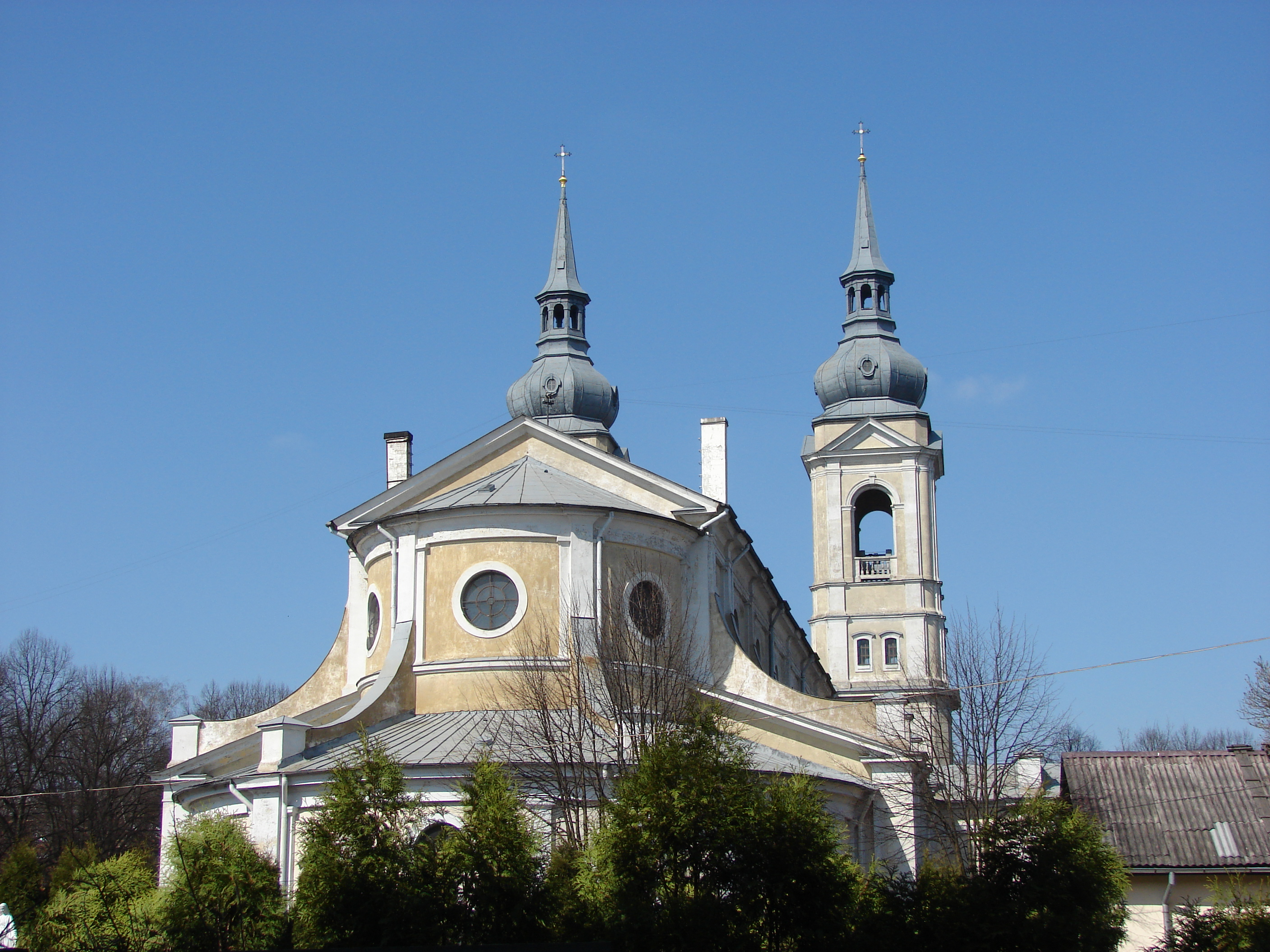
Roman Catholic Church of St. Albert in Riga

== Personal life ==
In 1905, due to declining health, Koch retired and returned to Karlovy Vary. He remained active in cultural circles and maintained correspondence with Czech colleagues. Among his final contributions was the design of a monument base for Dr. Gall Hochberger in Karlovy Vary.

Koch was married to Theresa Maria Augusta and had four sons. For his service, he received several honors from Tsar Alexander III (1845–1894), including nobility and orders such as the Order of St. Stanislaus and the Order of St. Anna.

He died in Karlovy Vary on 12 March 1915 from chronic nephritis.
