= Rovná (Sokolov District) =

- Municipality
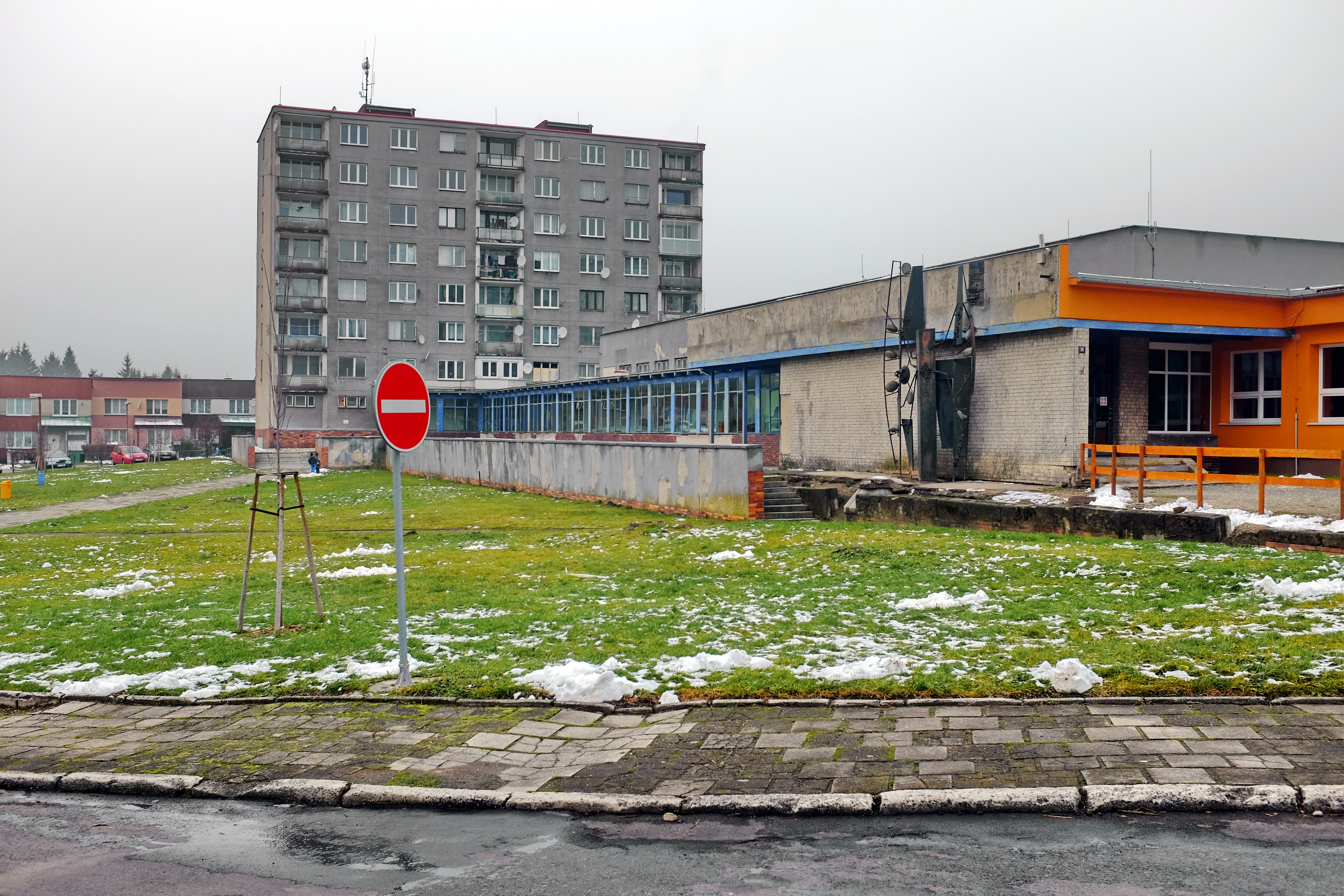
- Centre of Rovná

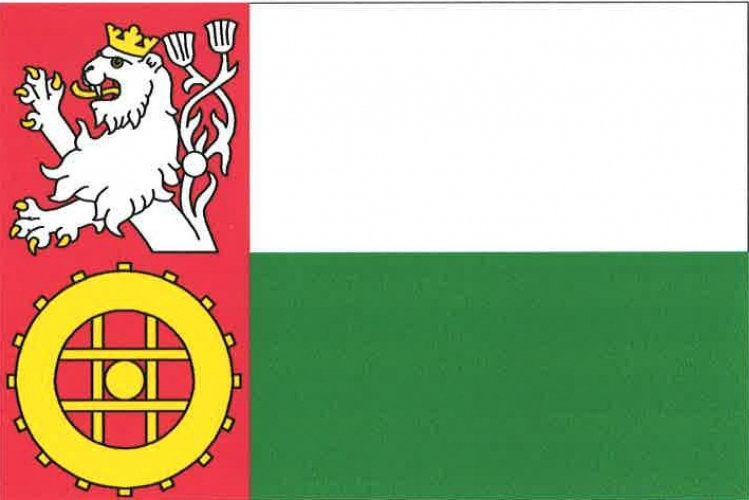
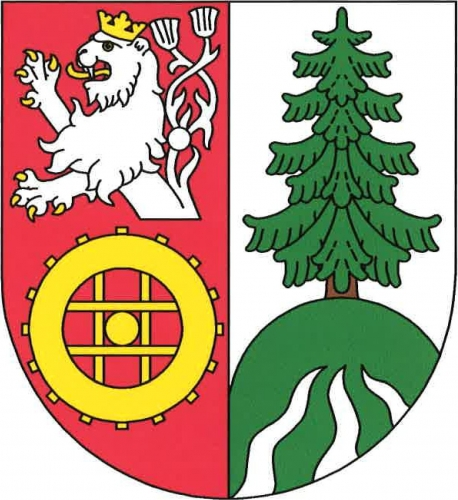
- Flag Coat of arms

- Location in the Czech Republic
- Coordinates: 50°6′16″N 12°40′8″E
- Country: Czech Republic
- Region: Karlovy Vary
- District: Sokolov
- First mentioned: 1370

Area
  - Total: 44.11 km^{2} (17.03 sq mi)
- Elevation: 700 m (2,300 ft)

Population (2026-01-01)
  - Total: 338
  - Density: 7.66/km^{2} (19.8/sq mi)
- Time zone: UTC+1 (CET)
  - Summer (DST): UTC+2 (CEST)
- Postal code: 356 01
- Website: www.rovna.eu

Rovná (German: Ebmeth) is a municipality and village in Sokolov District in the Karlovy Vary Region of the Czech Republic. It has about 300 inhabitants.

== Administrative division ==
Rovná consists of two municipal parts (in brackets population according to the 2021 census):

- Rovná (250)
- Podstrání (14)

== Demographics ==
Historical population
Year	Pop.	±%
1869	3,250	—
1880	3,051	−6.1%
1890	2,816	−7.7%
1900	2,608	−7.4%
1910	2,329	−10.7%
1921	2,080	−10.7%
1930	1,943	−6.6%
1950	6	−99.7%
1961	21	+250.0%
1970	461	+2095.2%
1980	542	+17.6%
1991	492	−9.2%
2001	593	+20.5%
2011	381	−35.8%
2021	264	−30.7%
Source: Censuses

== Notable people ==
- Johann von Koch (1850–1915), German architect
