= St. Albert's Church, Riga =

Church in Riga, Latvia

Coordinates: 56°55′49.48″N 24°4′8.03″E

St. Albert's Church
- Svētā Alberta Romas katoļu baznīca
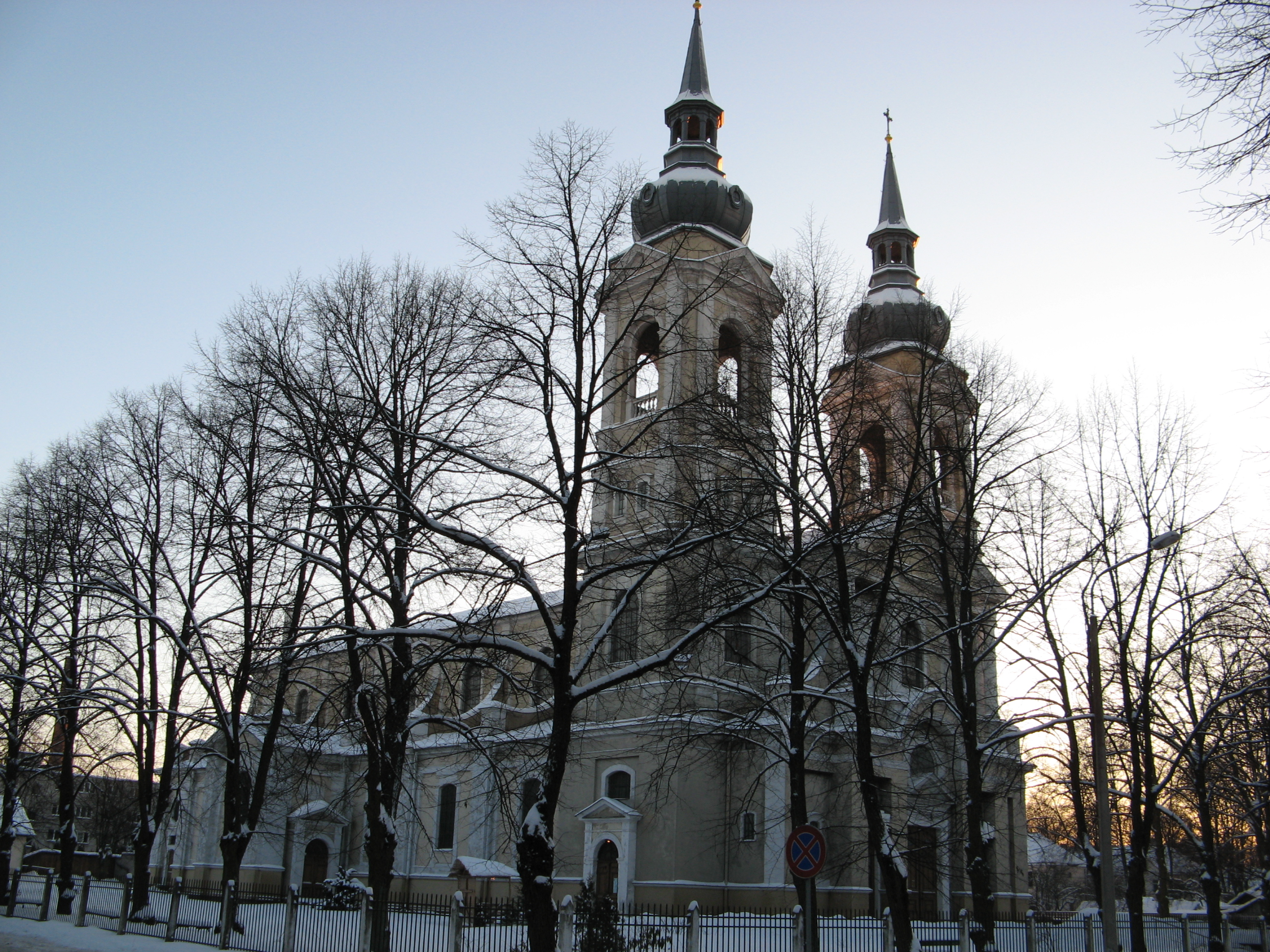

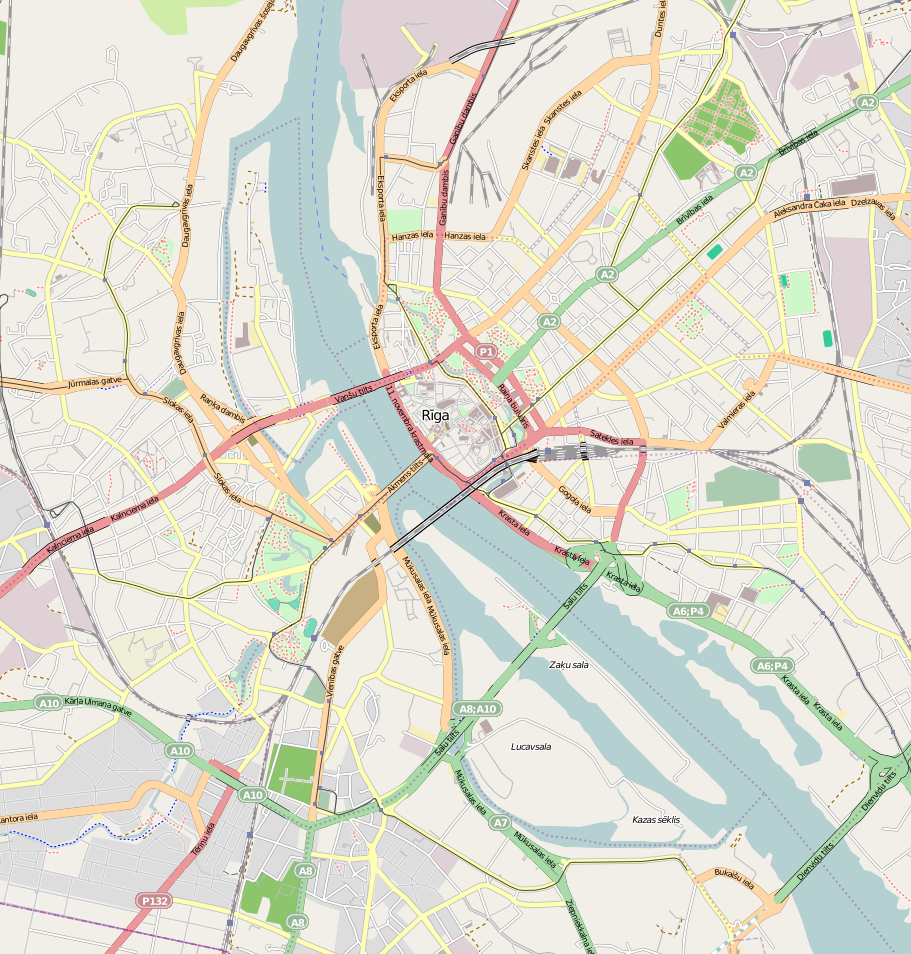
- Location within Riga
- Location: Riga
- Country: Latvia
- Denomination: Roman Catholic
- Website: Church Website

Architecture
- Architect(s): Johann von Koch, Wilhelm Bockslaff
- Groundbreaking: 1901

Specifications
- Capacity: 2,500

St. Albert's Church (Latvian: Svētā Alberta Romas katoļu baznīca) is a Roman Catholic church of the Riga Archdiocese in Riga, the capital of Latvia. The church is located in the Zemgale suburb, Āgenskalns, at Liepājas Street 38. The church was built for the 700th anniversary of Riga, in honor of Albertus Magnus (1193–1280). It is the biggest catholic church in Latvia it can host around 2500 people.

== History ==
As Riga's population grew rapidly in the 19th century, the parish priest Prelate Francis Afanasovičs, on the eve of the city's 700th anniversary in 1899, proposed building a new Catholic church in Pārdaugava, on the left bank of the Daugava River.

On 22 May 1899, the Riga City Council donated 1,600 square metres of land on Kurzemes Street for the construction of a Catholic church, school and parish house.

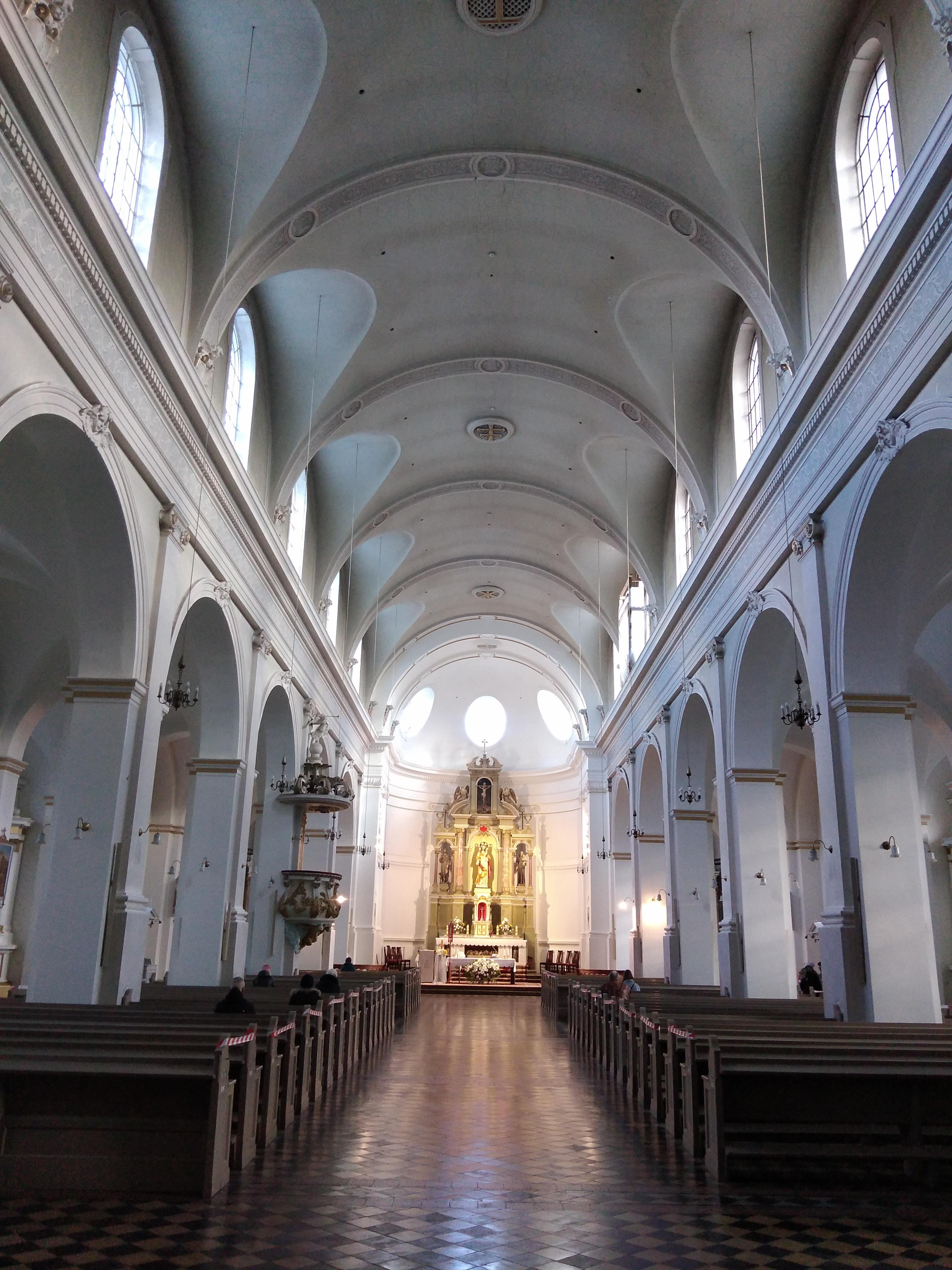
St. Albert Church, Riga, inside view

A year later, in 1900, on July 14, architect and dean of the Faculty of Architecture of Riga Polytechnic Institute, prof. Johan Koch presented to the Building Committee a project for the two towers French Baroque style church. On September 2, of the same year, the proposed project was approved.

Just two months later, on 10 November 1901, the foundation stone of the new church was consecrated by the parish priest, Prelate Francis Afanasovičs.

Only two years later, November 29, 1903, the parish priest prelate Francis Afanasovičs consecrated the new church dedicated to St. Albert the Great, built under supervision of the architect Wilhelm Bockslaff who made some minor changes to the original project. The church is built as a three nave church 50 m long and 24 m wide, which makes of it the largest Catholic church in Latvia.

The church is a classicist three-aisle basilica with twin towers capped with Baroque onion domes. Koch drew inspiration from Venetian works by Andrea Palladio—particularly the white interior of Il Redentore, which emphasizes the architecture itself, and San Francesco della Vigna, whose façade resembles Koch’s design (though not its twin towers). Ionic pilasters around the nave support a massive cornice topped with a barrel vault interrupted by lunette windows.

In 1911, when Riga's prelature has divided into three parishes, reverend Dominiks Taujenis became the first parish priest of the St. Albert 's parish. At the end of the year of 1914, the number of parish faithfuls reached 20,000. During the World War I, reverend Felikss Poško was active in the parish. From the 1919, reverend Peteris Silovičs, the well-known author of Catholic books and an adviser to the archdiocese from 1925, became the parish priest.

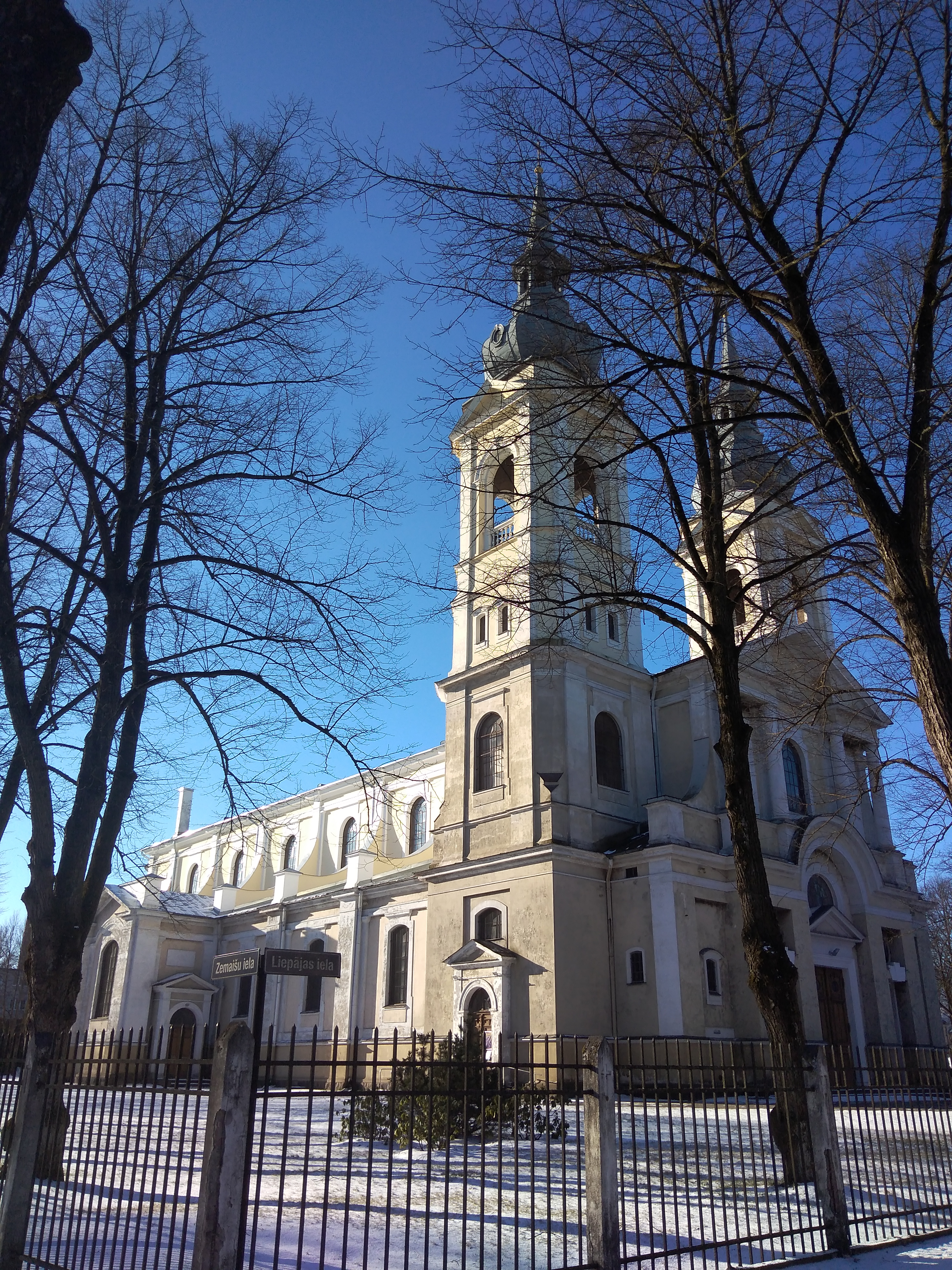
St. Albert Church, Riga, outside view

The convent house has its own history. The house belonged to reverend Peteris Silovičs, and it was originally built in Jūrkalne, a small town by the sea, some 200 km far away from Riga. When reverend Peteris Silovičs moved to Riga, he got the house dismantled and transported to Riga, by the sea way. It was re-installed within a church yard. Finally, to accommodate the needs of the time, in 1936, a stone building was built instead. The doors and windows of this new stone house were obtained from a certain ruined summer house, in Jurmala. "So the old and the new convent houses have seen the sea.", was an extraordinary remark of the Latvian Catholic historian, reverend Jānis Svilāns.

In June 1933, Auxiliary Bishop of Riga, Jāzeps Rancāns, on behalf of Metropolitan Archbishop of Riga, Antonijus Springovičs, the parish of Saint Albert entrusted to the Franciscan Order of Friars Minor Capuchin.

The great and final reparation of the church took place in 1935, undertaken by Franciscans themselves.

The Franciscans ministered the parish until October 19, 1949. when the Franciscan convent was closed and the parish was entrusted back to diocesan priests.

The most extensive repairs of the interior took place in 1968-1969, while the facade was repaired and painted in 1988.

After the restoration of Latvia's independence, the parish of Saint Albert was, in June, 1991. once again, entrusted to the same Franciscan Order.

The new, great refreshment of the church started in 2016, and it is still ongoing in 2021. This refreshment of the church is very comprehensive, including the construction works and complete interior and exterior: painting and restoration of the church. It is expected to be finished by 2024.

== Altars ==
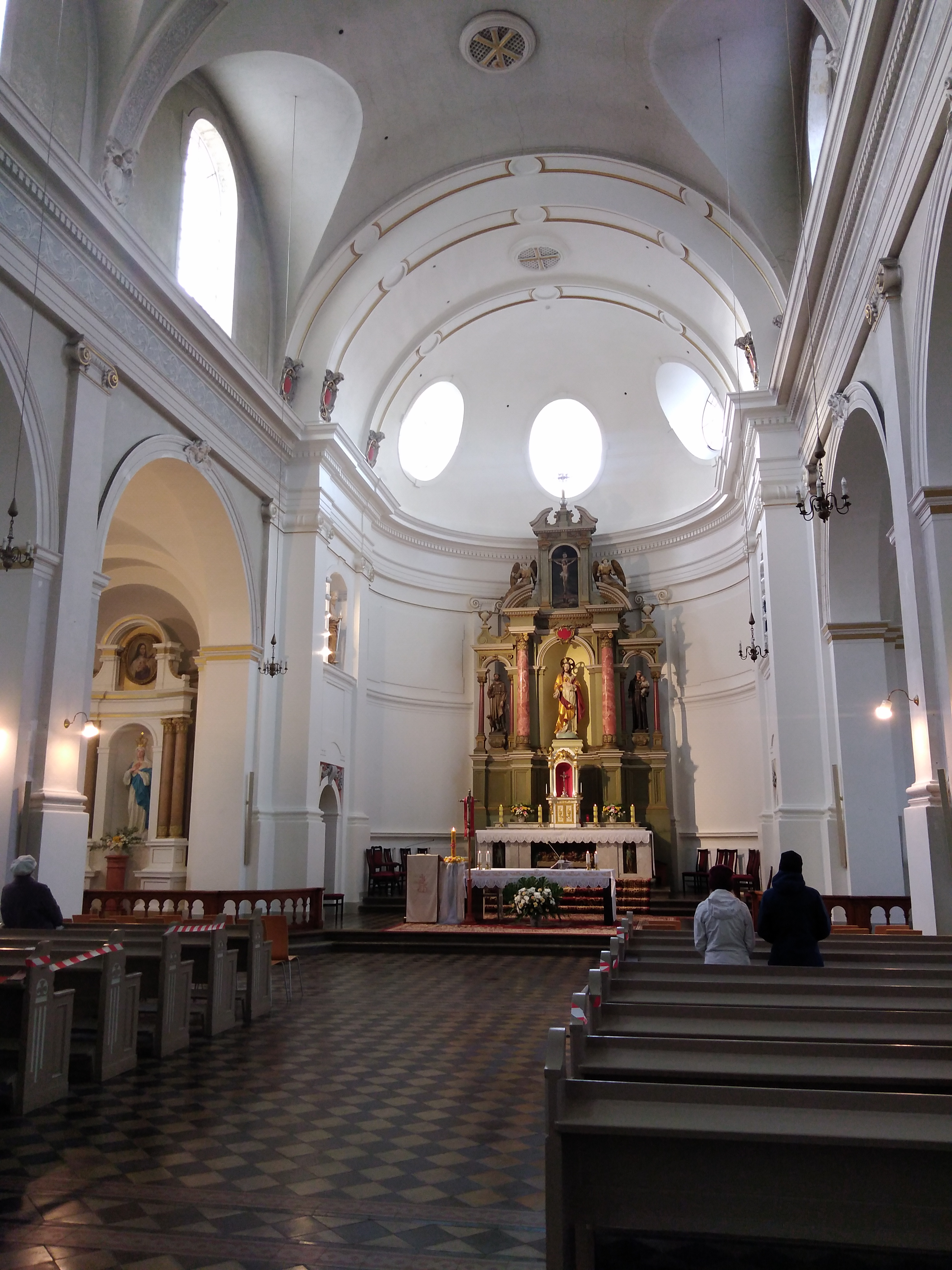
St. Albert Church, Riga, the Sacred Heart of Jesus, the Main altar

In addition to the main altar, the church has four other altars. Two of them are on either side of the main altar. The other two altars are on either side of the church, in the centre, each in a small chapel room within the side naves of the church. One altar is to the right of the main entrance to the church.

=== The main altar ===
The main altar of a church is dedicated to the Sacred Heart Of Jesus. At the central position of the altar, above the tabernacle, is a rather large statue showing Jesus offering his Sacred Heart. On both sides are niches with the statues. On the right side is the typical statue of saint Rocco as a pilgrim, with staff in his hand and a dog next to his leg. On the right side is a typical statue of Saint Anthony of Padua, holding a Baby Jesus and a lily. High above, dominating the altar is a painting of Jesus on the cross in Golgotha. The background of the painting, behind the back of Jesus, is painted dark sky, suggesting the moment when Jesus gave his last breath.

The main altar is placed in a round niche room. It is very high, with two niches on each side. On the left side, within a wall niche, is a statue showing Saint Peter with a key, while within the right side wall niche is the statue of Saint Paul with a sword.

=== The Immaculate Heart of Mary altar ===
The altar dedicated to the Immaculate Heart of Mary is on the right side of the main altar. On the altar is a great statue of the Holy Mary, Queen of heaven and earth, offering her heart, dressed in a sky blue color dress, with a crown on her head. Above the statues of Holy Mary is a painting of Saint Therese of Lisieux also known as Saint Therese of the Child Jesus and the Holy Face.

=== The Saint Albert the Great altar ===
The altar is decorated with an altar size painting of the saint, showing Saint Albert the Great, dressed in a liturgical garments wearing a miter and bearing a pastoral staff.

=== The Holy Family altar ===
Within a right side niche room is placed the Holy Family altar decorated with the painting showing a Holy Family. Jesus is shown as a boy of possible age of twelve years, which suggest the painter's idea of describing the moment when Jesus was found in the Temple by Mary and Joseph.

=== The Saint Francis of Assisi altar ===
Within a left side niche room is placed altar decorated with the painting showing a vision of Saint Francis of Assisi. The vision is showing Jesus and Holy Mary in the front of surprised Francis who is dressed in a brown friar habit.

=== The Holy Mary altar ===
The altar of Holy Mary is placed within a small chapel, at the right side of the main entrance of the church. The altar is decorated with the statue of Holy Mary with baby Jesus in her right hand. The statue symbolizes the artist's poetic description of a "Woman of the Apocalypse": "A great sign appeared in the sky, a woman clothed with the sun, with the moon under her feet, and on her head a crown of twelve stars. She was with child and wailed aloud in pain as she labored to give birth." (Revelation 12:1–2).

The statue shows Holy Mary with a sad expression on her face. She is in tears, in pain. The sky blue long wrap dress, painted with the stars, is on her shoulders all the way down to her feet. She is standing with the moon globe under her feet, a twelve stars gloriole around her head. Holding baby Jesus in her right hand. With the arms widespread, baby Jesus is looking at his mother, an expression of consolation is on his face.

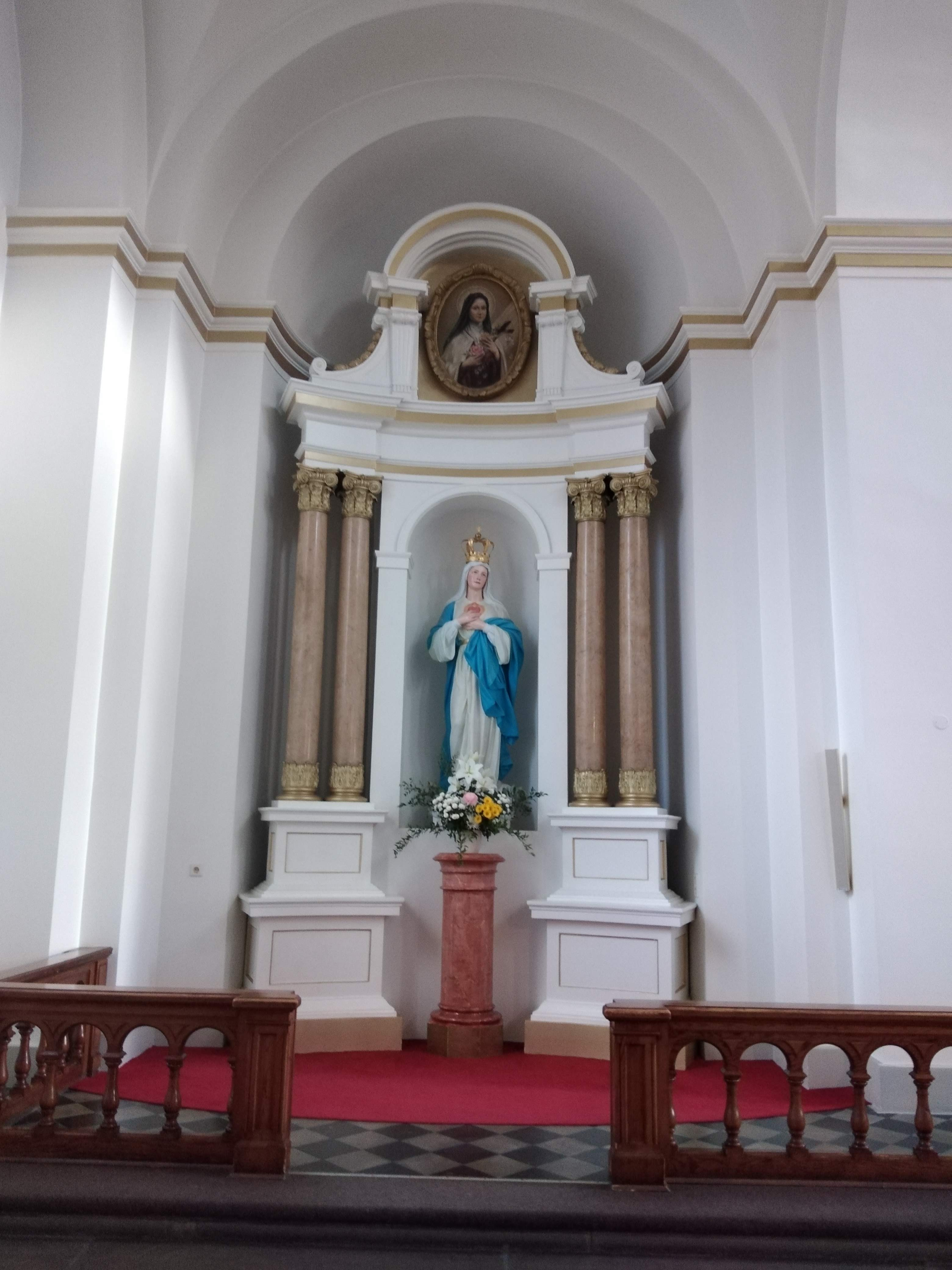
St. Albert Church, Riga, the Immaculate Heart of Mary altar

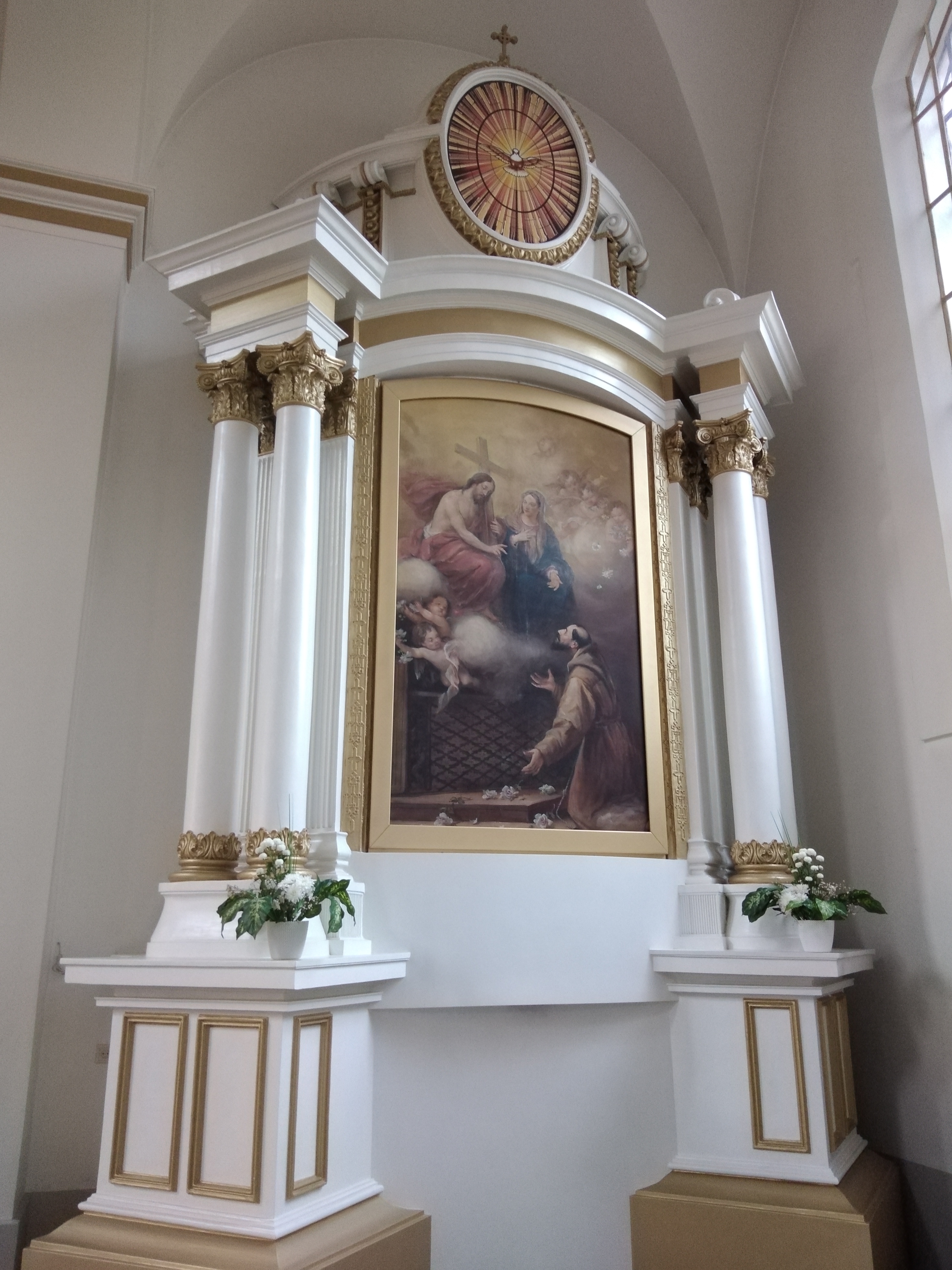
St. Albert Church, Riga, the Saint Francis's Vision, the altar

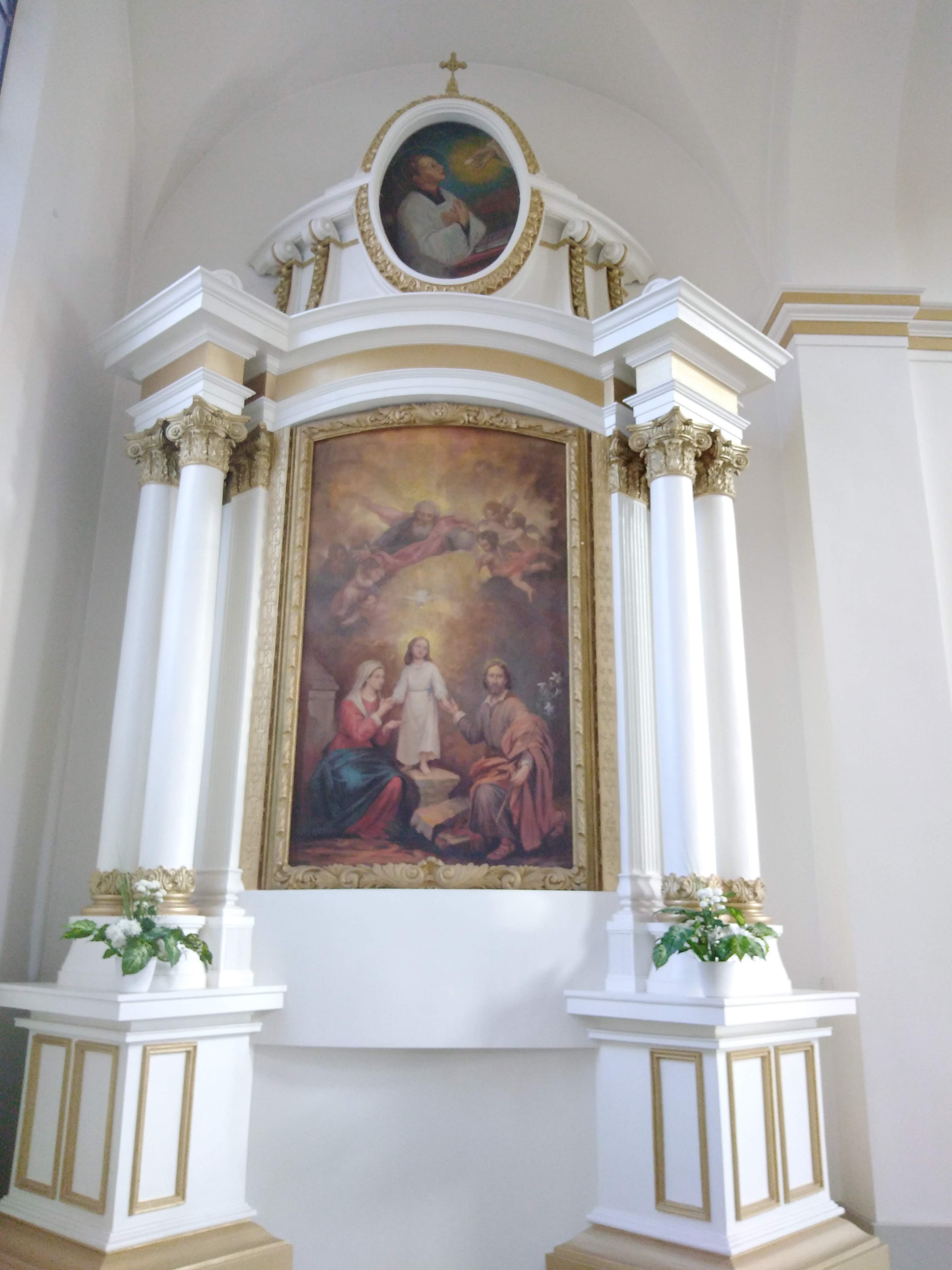
St. Albert Church, Riga, the Holy Family altar

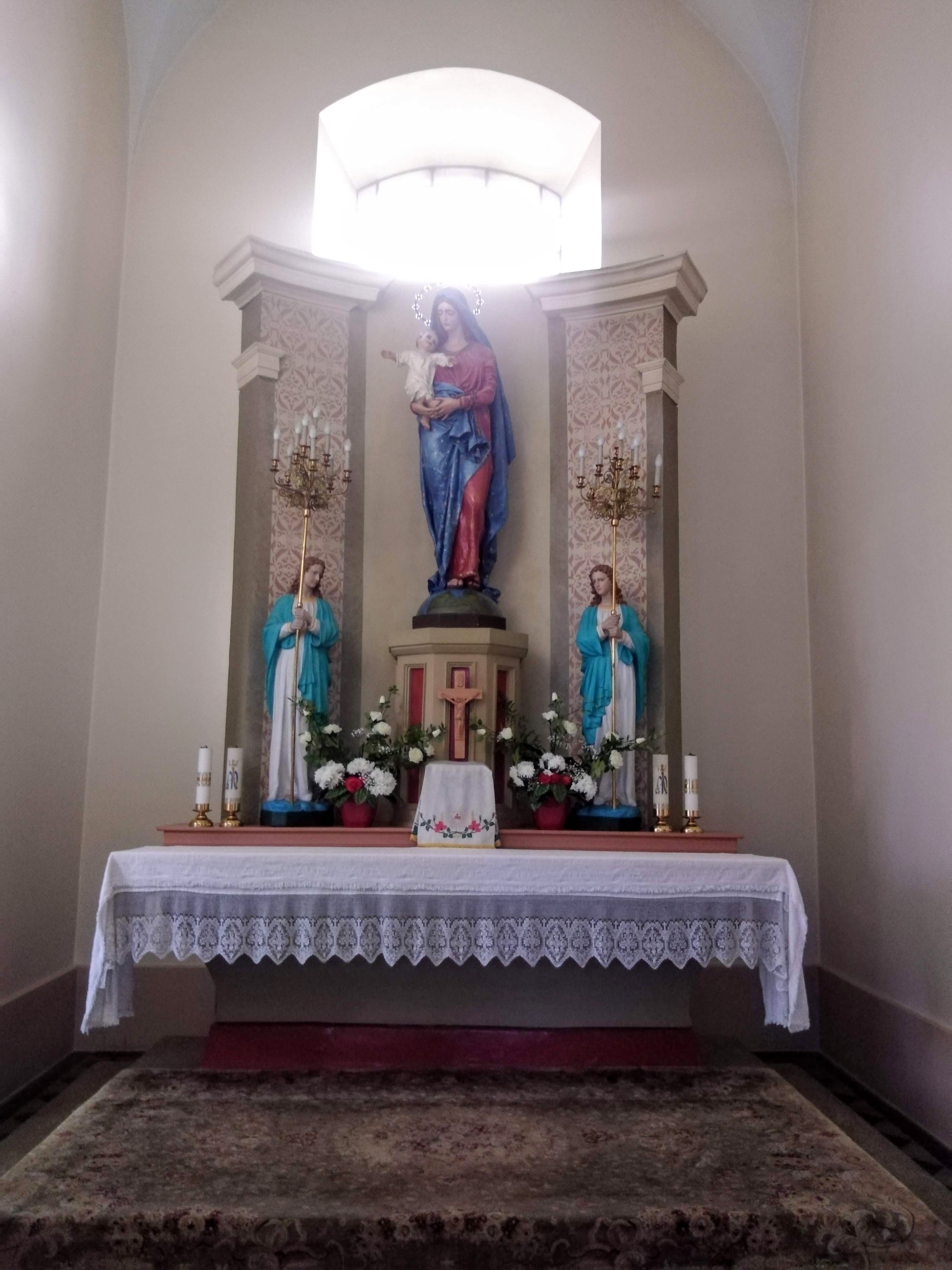
St. Albert Church, Riga, the Holy Mary altar

== Pipe organ ==
The church's 30 stop pipe organ was built in 1912 by Emil Martin & Co. Opus 316. Emil Martin (1848–1922) was the son of the well known organ builder August Martin (1808–1892) from Dachwig (Thuringia), who was very active in the Baltic region. Emil probably inherited the company from his father. This is suggested by the fact that the organ's nameplate states 1838 as the year the company was founded.

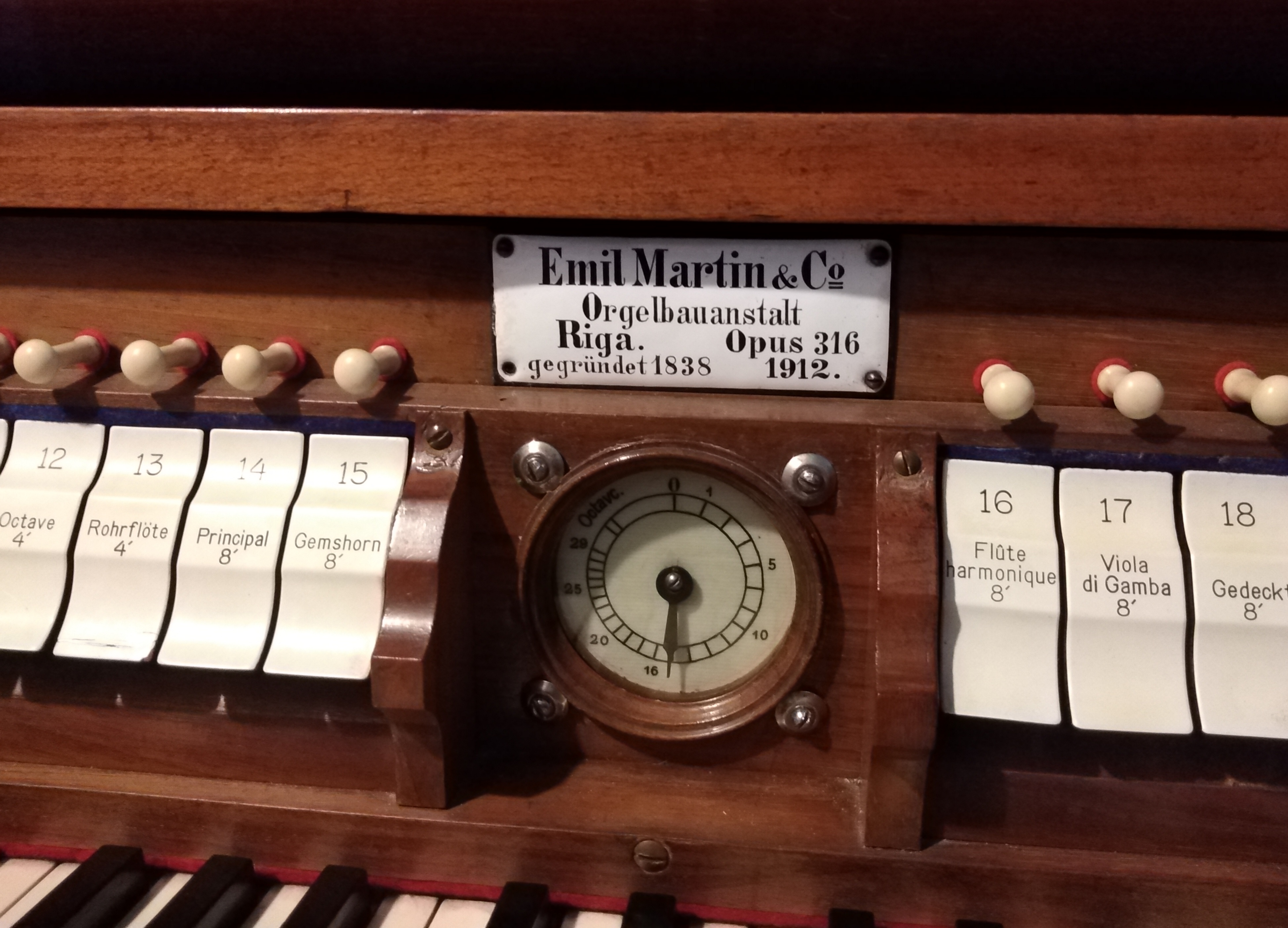
St. Albert Church, Riga, the pipe organ nameplate

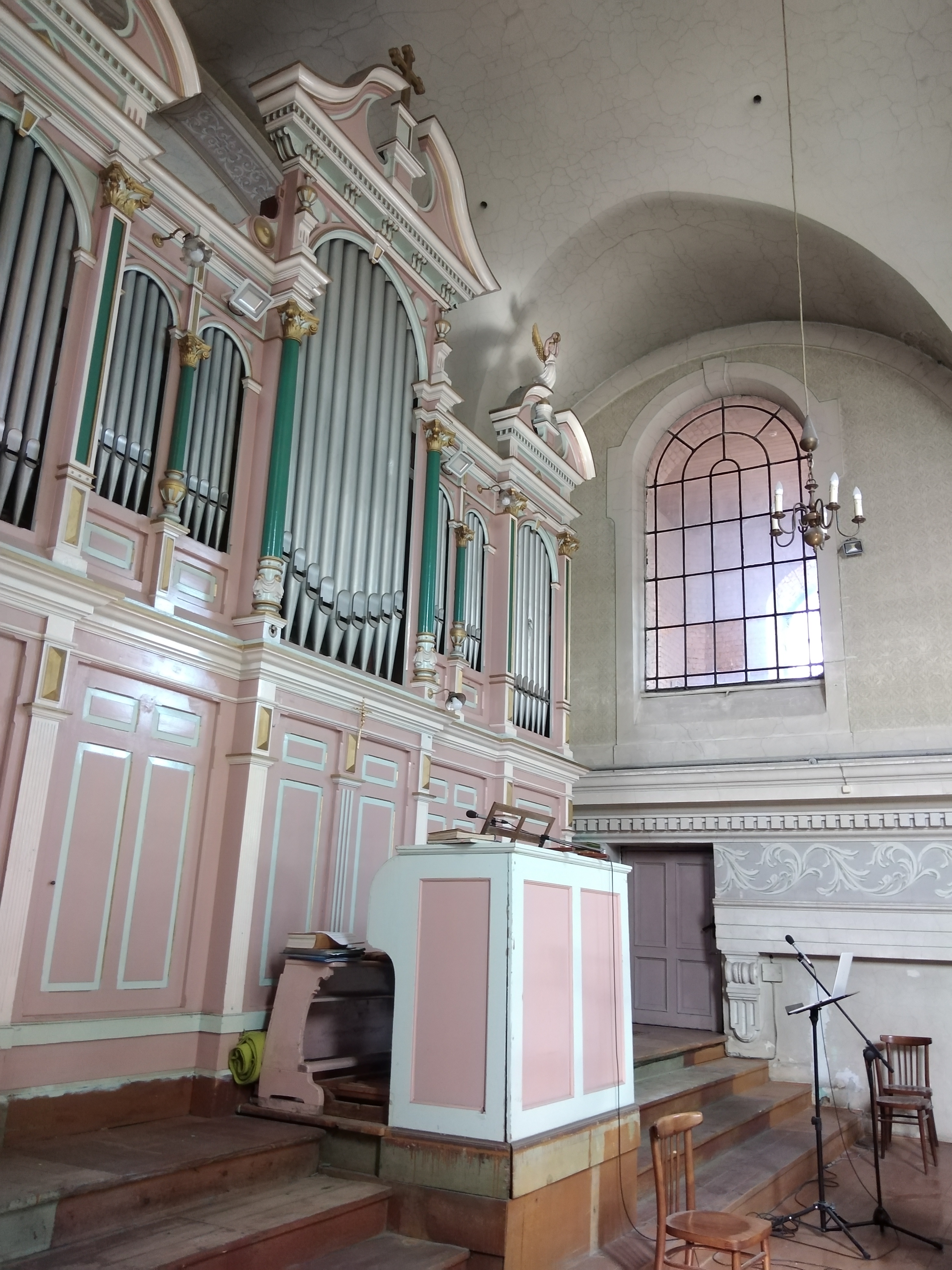
St. Albert Church, Riga, Pipe Organ

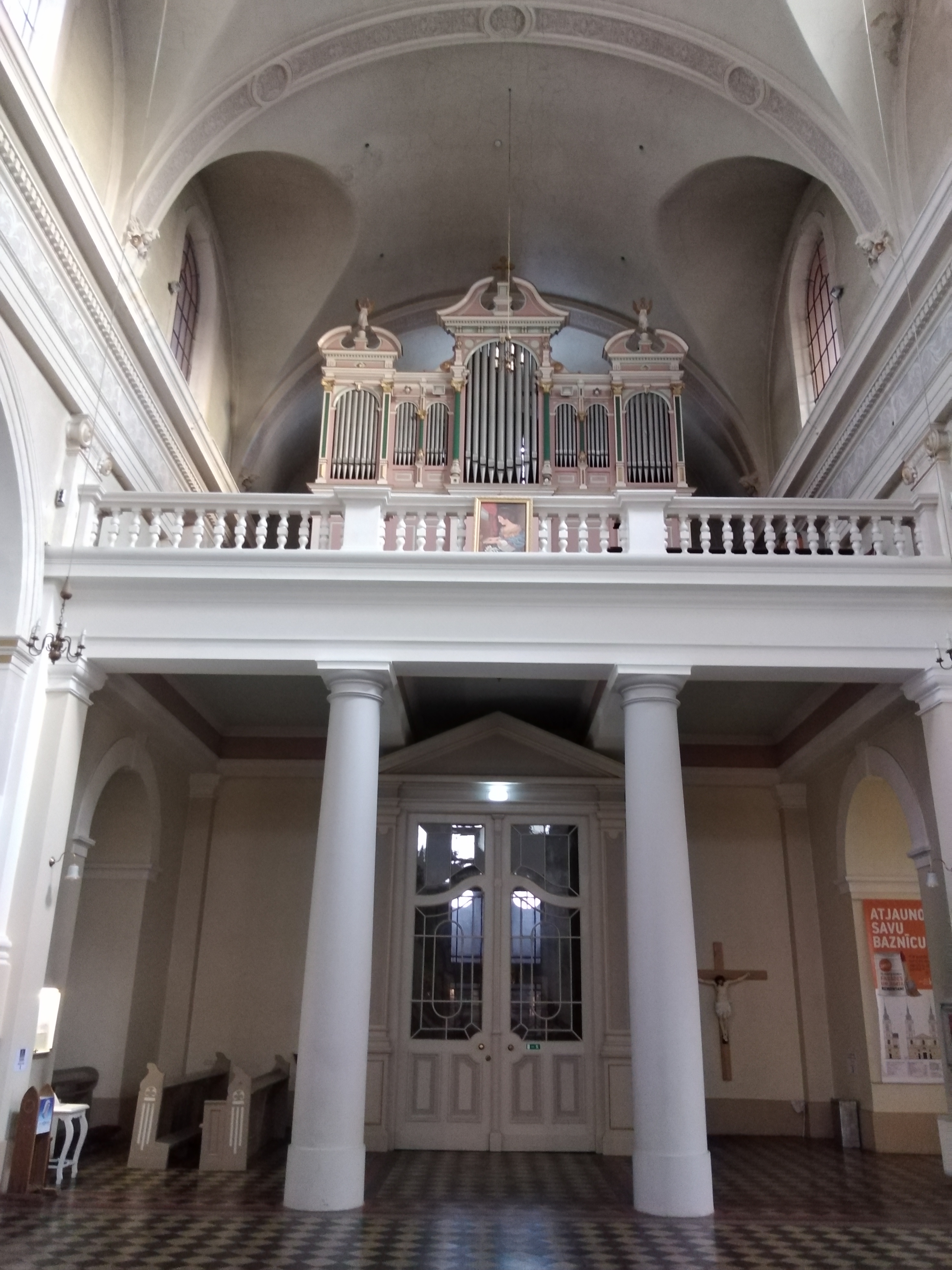
St. Albert Church, Riga, inside view, the main door with the Choir balcony

== Gallery ==
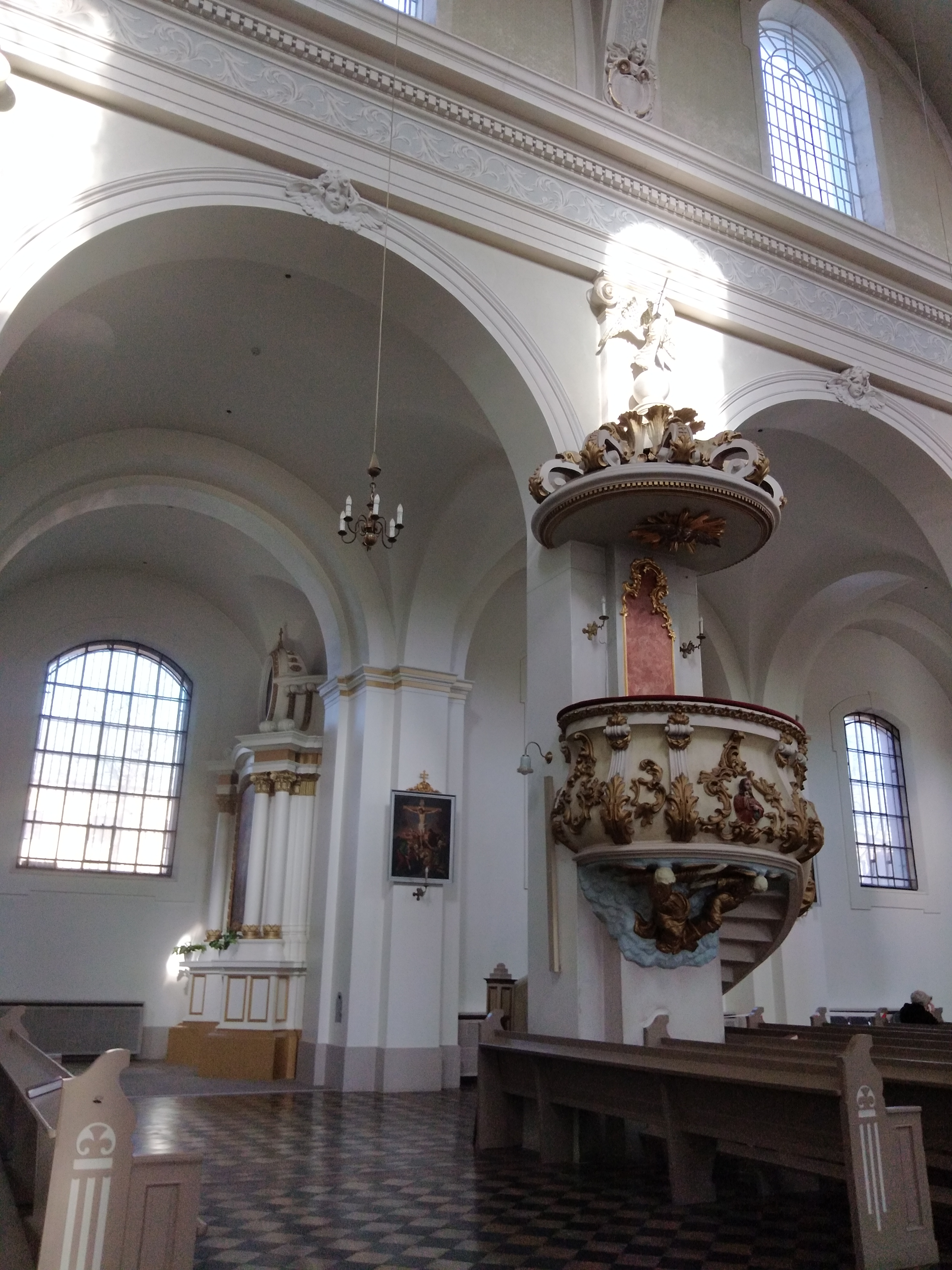
Saint Albert Church, Riga, Pulpit

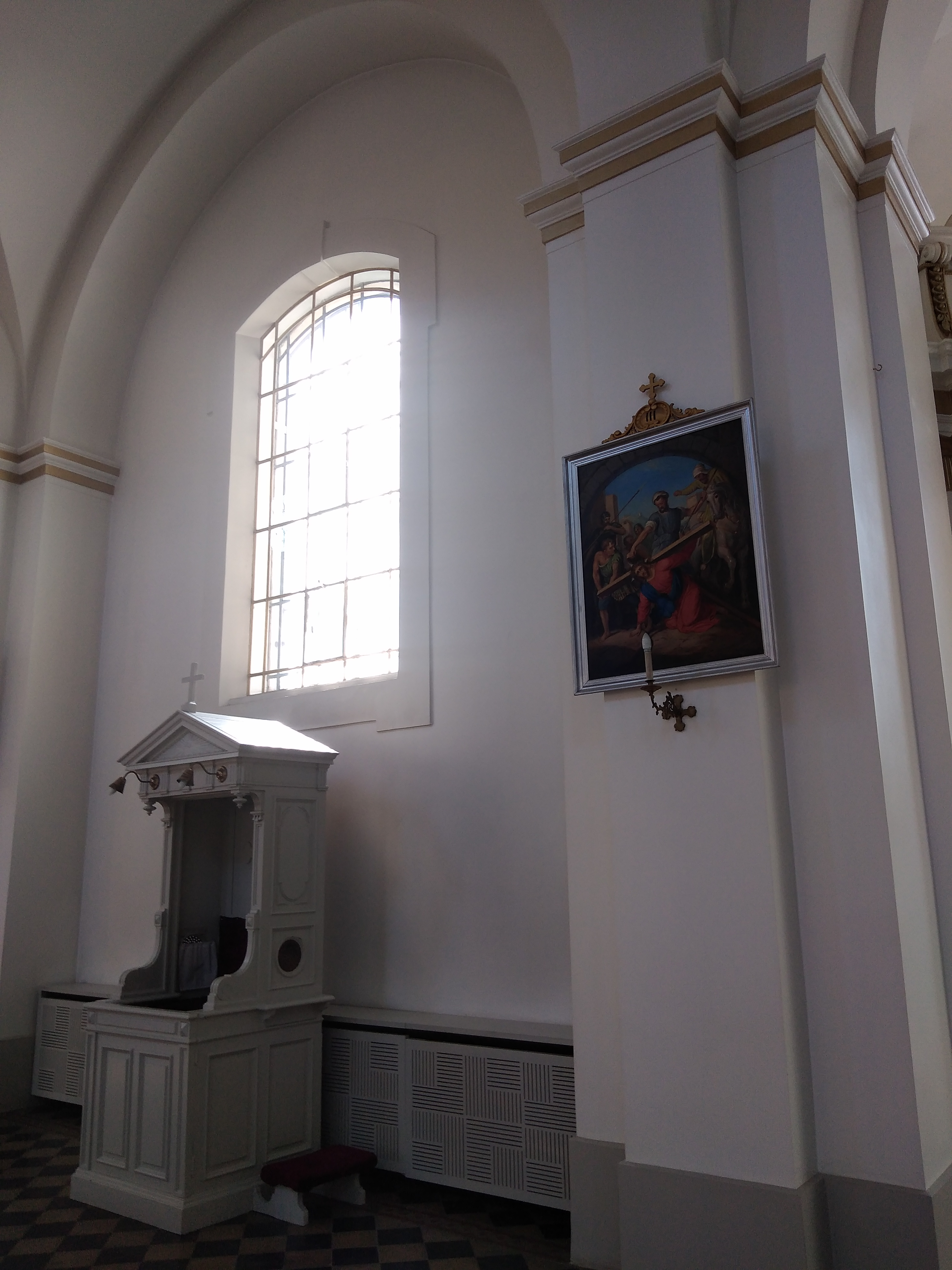
St. Albert Church, Riga, Confessional and Via Crucis

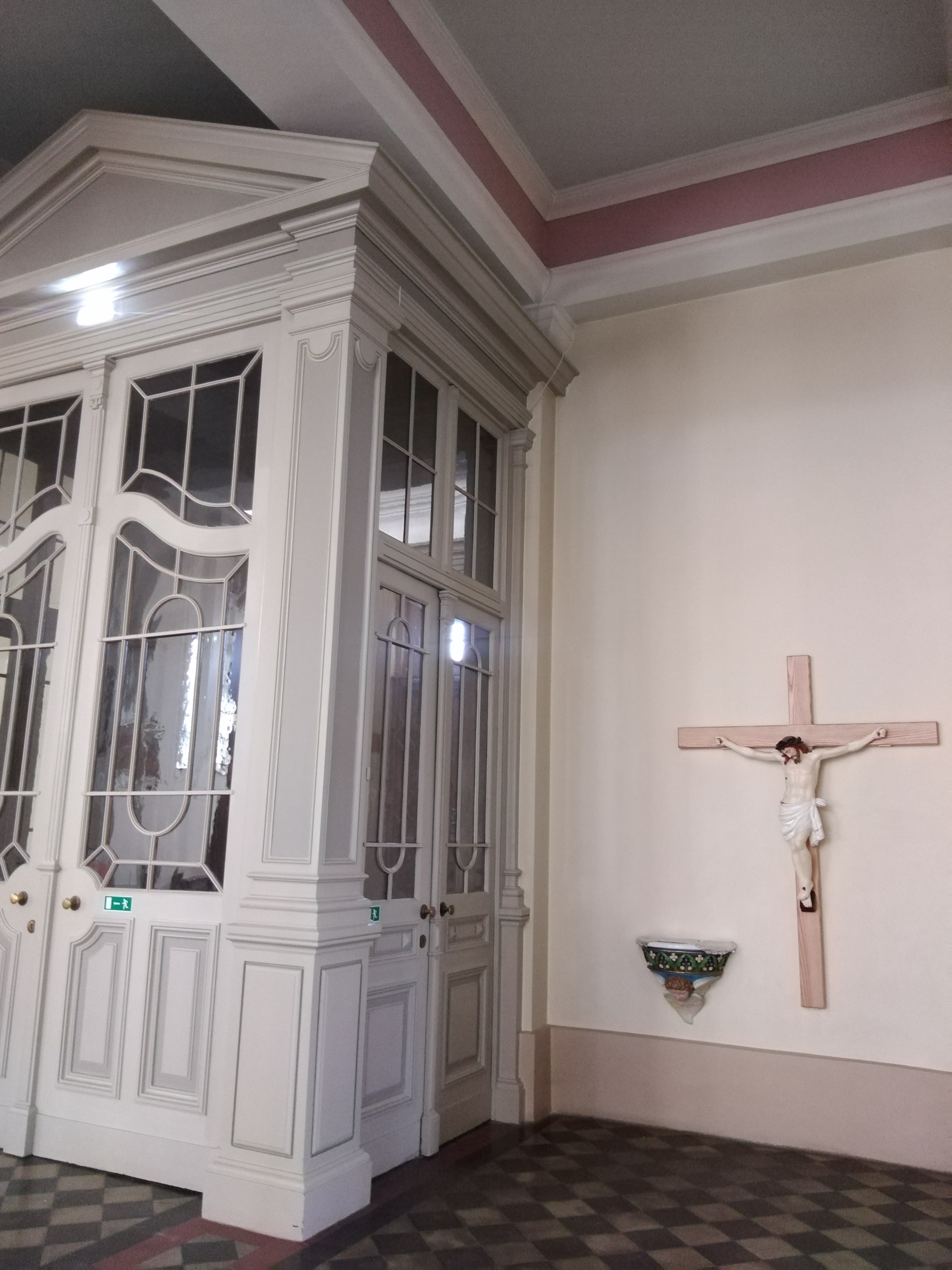
Saint Albert Church, Riga, the main door, inside
