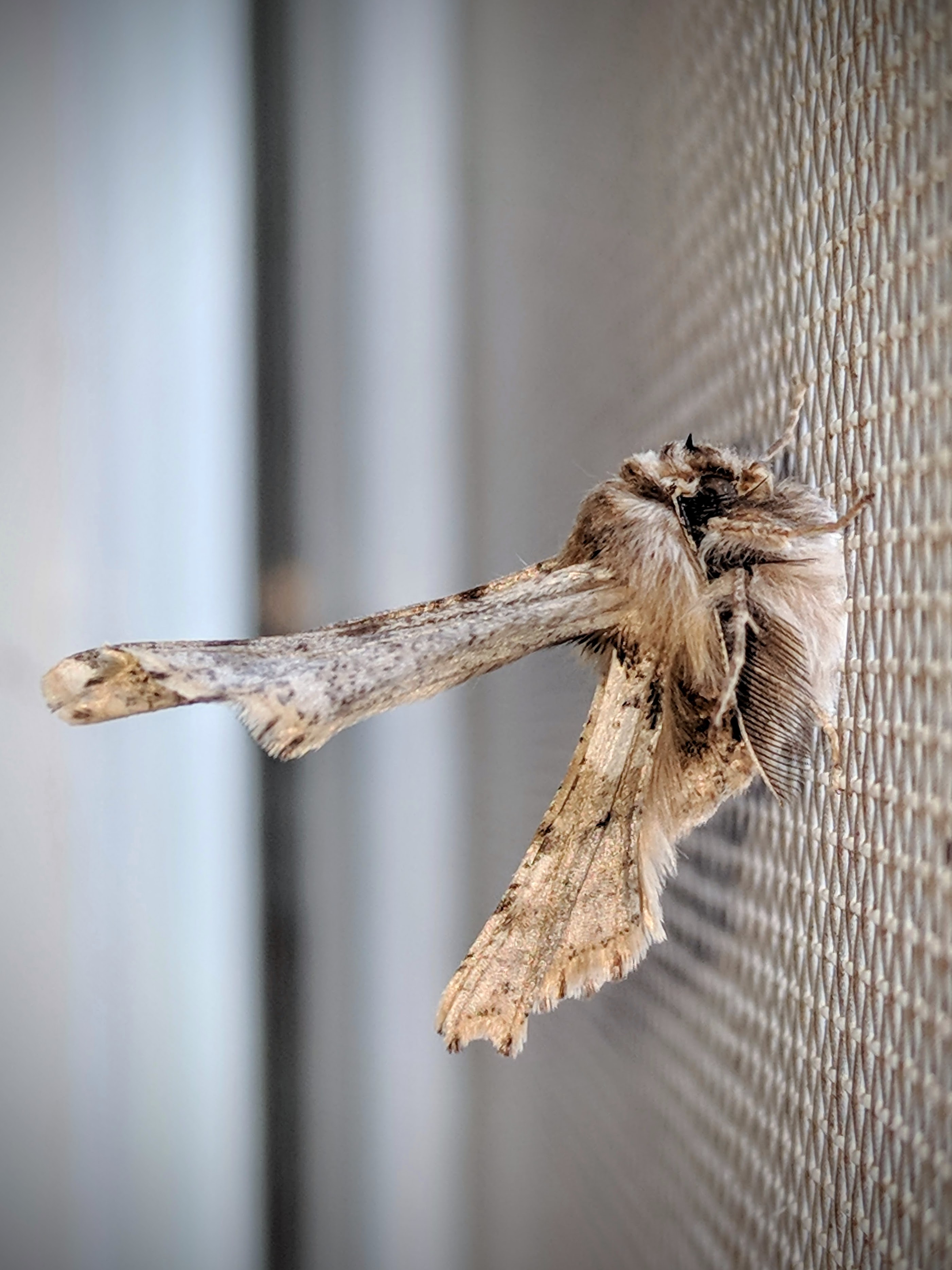

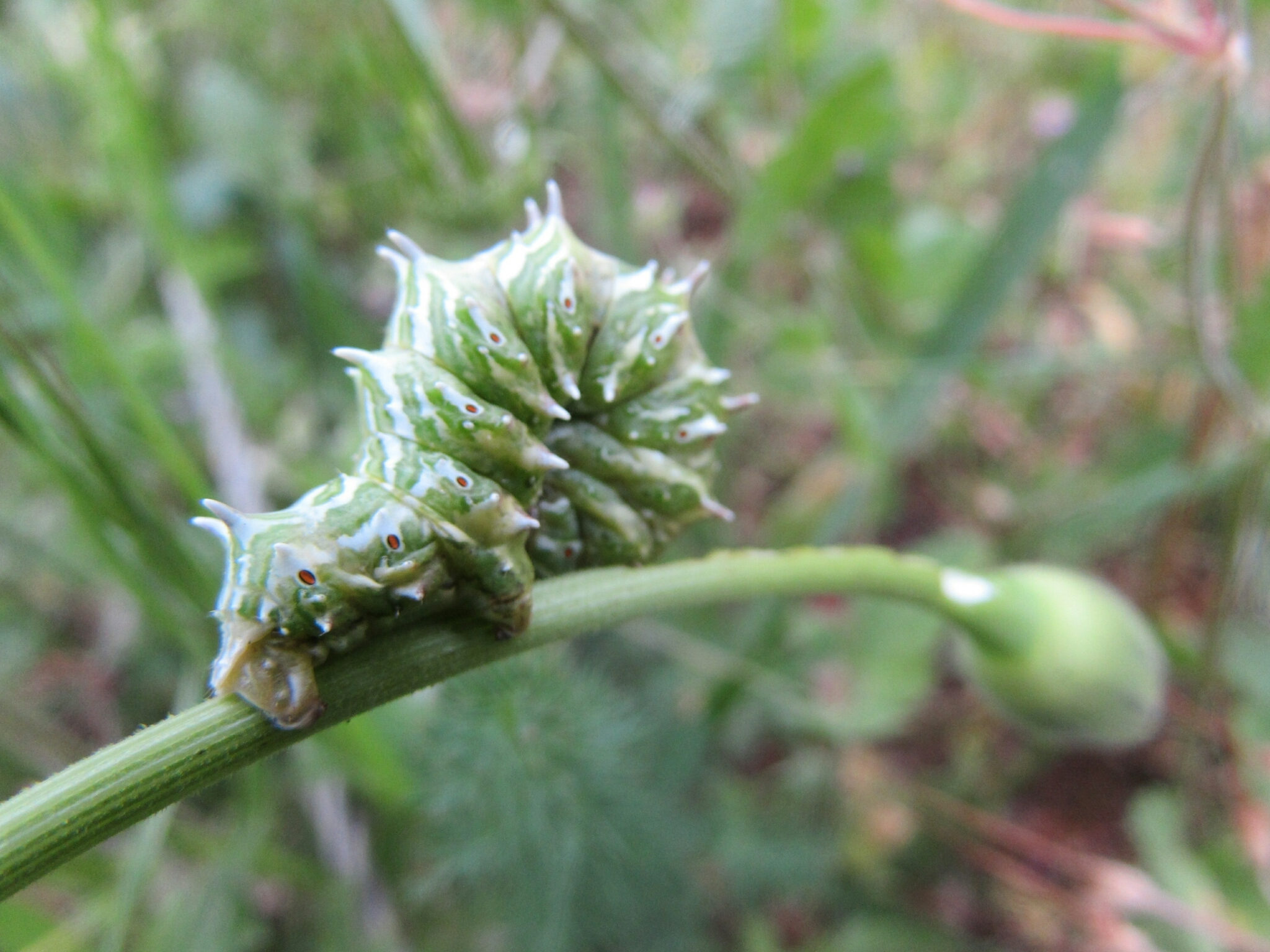
- Adult (top) and larva (bottom)

Scientific classification
- Kingdom: Animalia
- Phylum: Arthropoda
- Class: Insecta
- Order: Lepidoptera
- Family: Geometridae
- Genus: Apochima
- Species: A. flabellaria

Binomial name
- Apochima flabellaria (Heeger, [1838])

Synonyms
- Amphidasis flabellaria Heeger, [1838]

= Apochima flabellaria =

Species of moth

Apochima flabellaria is a species of moth in the family Geometridae. It was described by Heeger in 1838. It is found in North Africa, Spain, Italy, Bulgaria, North Macedonia, Greece, Ukraine, Russia, Turkey and the Near East, as well as on Sardinia, Sicily, Malta, Crete and Cyprus.

The wingspan is 34–39 mm for males and 32–41 mm for females. Adults are on wing from November to April.

The larvae feed on Taraxacum and Senecio species.

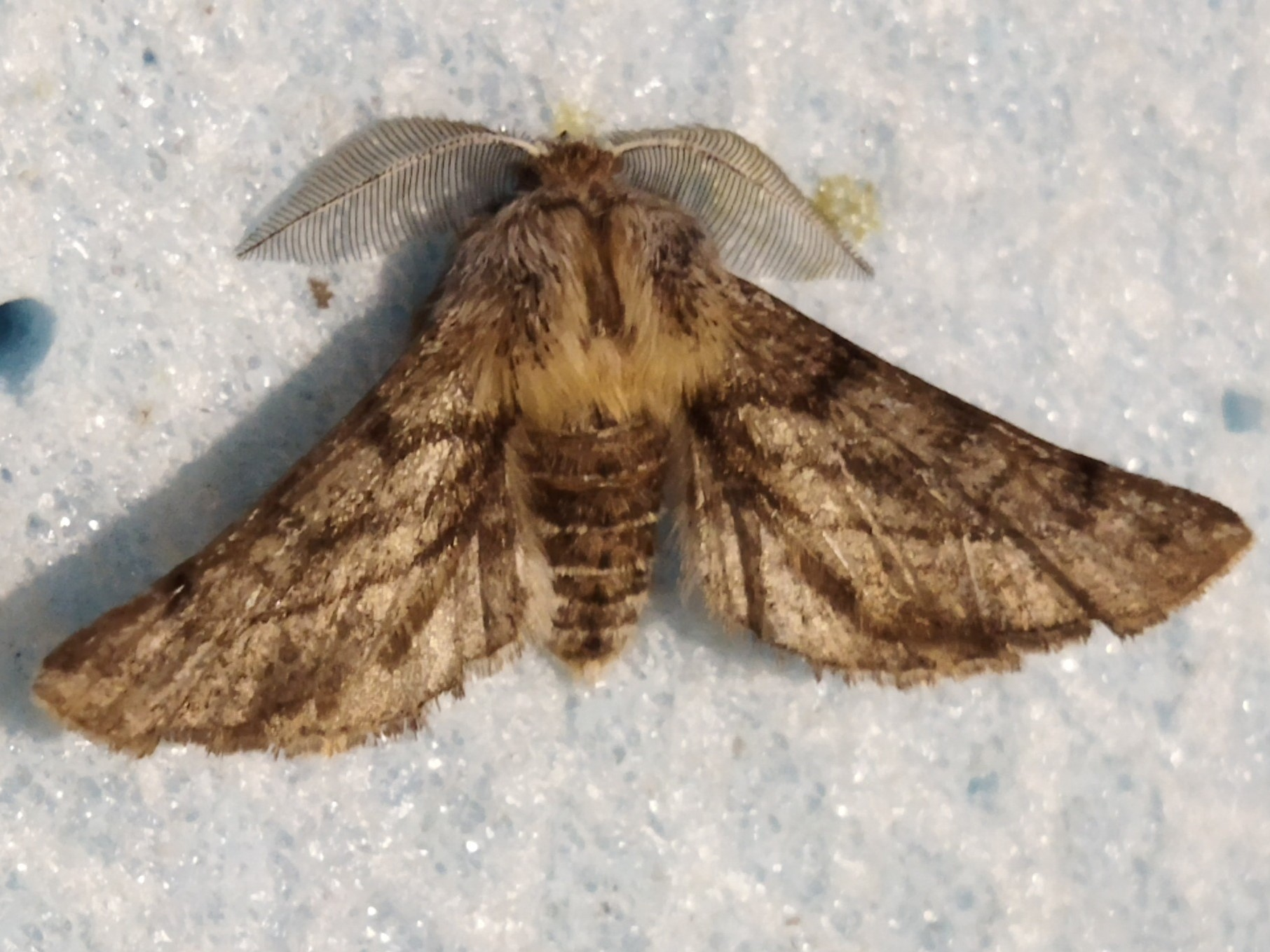
Adult
