= Thonetschlössl =

Coordinates: 48.0867°N 16.2879°E

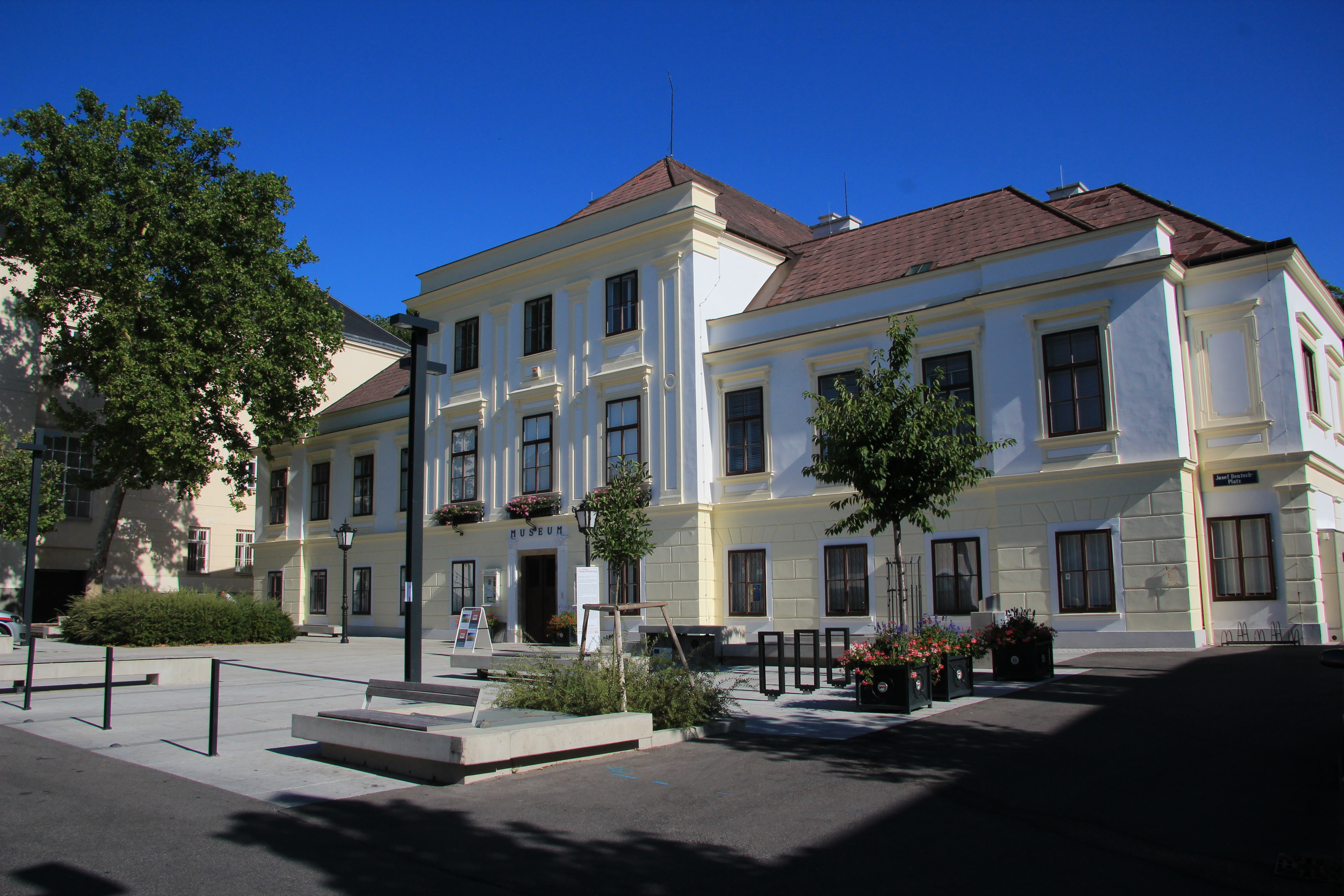
Thonetschlössl

Thonetschlössl in Mödling, Austria is a symmetric building with three floors. The building's architecture is mainly influenced by the Late-Baroque style. Currently the Thonetschlössl houses the local museum of Mödling.

== The history of the building ==
In 1631, Johann Baptist Verda von Verdenberg donated a Capuchin monastery to Mödling. In 1683, the monastery was destroyed in the Turkish War, but eventually rebuilt in 1684. Two years later, in 1686, Giacomo Caliano bought the monastery to use a factory to produce silk and towels.

From 1806 to 1821 the monastery was used for chemical bleaching, but later became a theater. In 1833, the entomologist Ernst Heeger bought the monastery and continued to use it for a silk factory. A few years later, in 1845, the countess Eise von Salm, who was a member of the Liechtenstein clan, bought the monastery and rebuilt it to look like a castle. In 1889, the Thonet family bought the castle-like building, hence the name Thonetschlössl ("Thonet Castle"). In 1931, the city of Mödling bought the Thonetschlössl to use for the museum of Mödling, which had existed elsewhere since 1904.

== The museum park ==
The museum park is a national heritage site, and opened to the public in 1957. The park itself contains a Baroque fountain basin, a Pietà group on a pedestal from the year 1756, three grave stones from the 16th and 17th century and a fragment of a gothic pillar from 1529.

== Museum collections ==
The museum documents the historical emergence of the city of Mödling. There are also rocks, fossils and historical artifacts, like biographies of famous citizens of the city of Mödling or weapons from the Turkish Wars, displayed. The museum also owns one of Austria's first Avars collections. Some parts of the museum are originally from Oskar Spiegel's private palaeontological collection, which was acquired by the city of Mödling. Furthermore, another section of the museum consists of Joseph Hyrtl's library, which contains books and writings by famous writers like Paracelsus and Johannes Wesling. These were digitized and are now available on the Internet to the general public.
