= Liberda =

Liberda is a surname. Notable people with the surname include:

- Bruno Liberda (born 1953), Austrian classical composer
- Jan Liberda (1936–2020), Polish footballer and manager
- Krystyna Liberda-Stawarska (born 1968), Polish biathlete
- Mariusz Liberda (born 1976), Polish footballer
