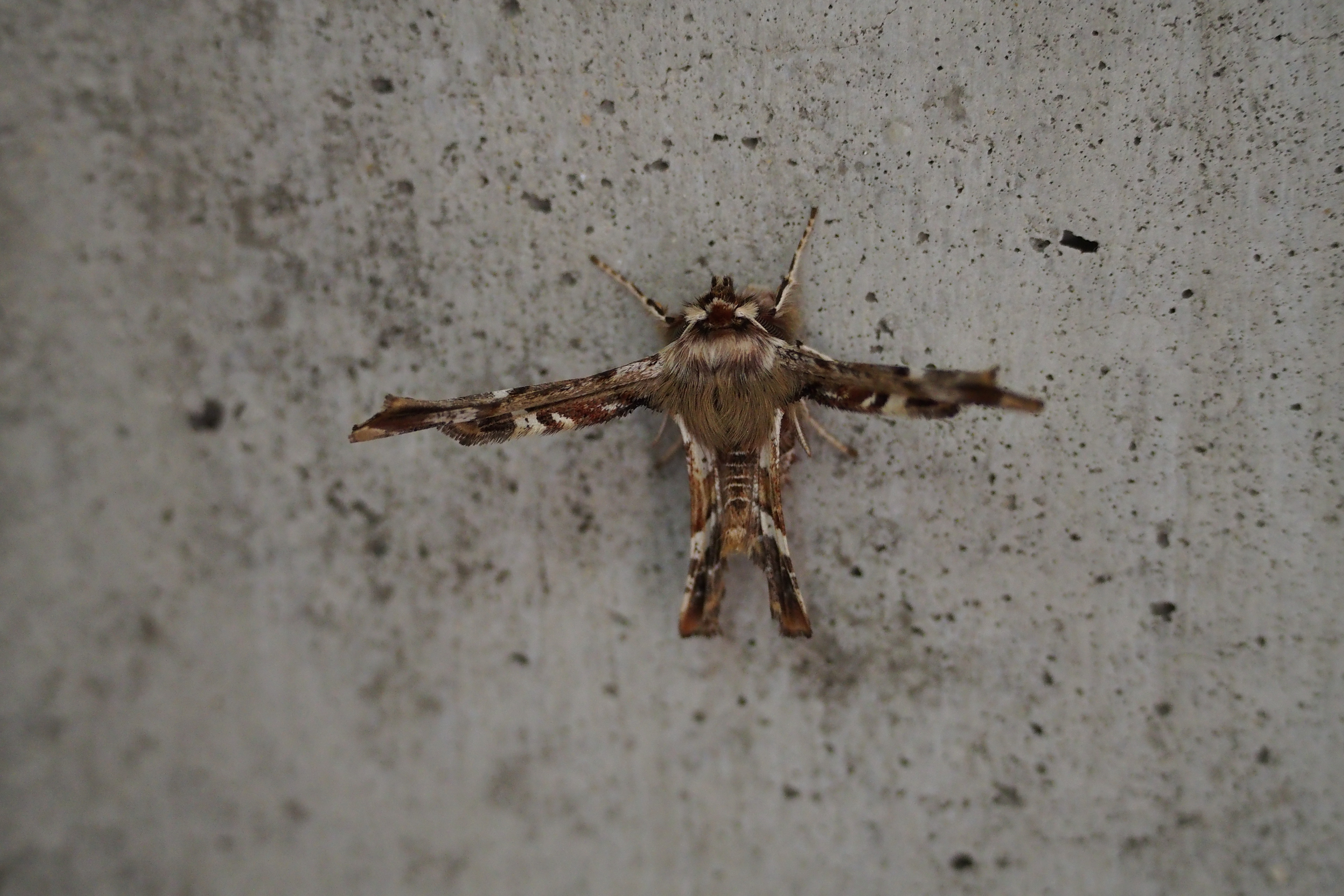
- Apochima juglansiaria

Scientific classification
- Kingdom: Animalia
- Phylum: Arthropoda
- Class: Insecta
- Order: Lepidoptera
- Family: Geometridae
- Subfamily: Ennominae
- Genus: Apochima; Agassiz, 1847

= Apochima =

Genus of geometer moths

Apochima is a genus of moths in the family Geometridae.

== Species ==
- Apochima diaphanaria (Püngeler, 1904)
- Apochima flabellaria (Heeger, 1838)
- Apochima juglansiaria (Graeser, 1888)
- Apochima rjabovi (Wehrli, 1936)
