= Manfred Hemm =

Austrian opera singer (born 1961)

Manfred Hemm (born 1961) is an Austrian opera singer who has sung leading bass-baritone roles in the opera houses of Europe and North America. His discography includes Papageno in The Magic Flute for Deutsche Grammophon and the bass soloist in Franz Schmidt's oratorio Das Buch Mit Sieben Siegeln for Chandos. He created the role of Der Stadtrichter in Friedrich Cerha's Der Rattenfänger (1987) and the title role in Gottfried von Einem's Der Tulifant (1990) in their world premieres.

== Life and career ==
Hemm was born in Mödling, Austria, and studied at the Vienna Conservatory. He made his debut in 1984 at the Stadttheater Klagenfurt as Figaro in The Marriage of Figaro. From 1984 to 1987 he sang regularly at the Opernhaus Graz and Theater Augsburg, specialising in Mozartean roles. Major house debuts followed at the Bayreuth Festival in 1987, the Vienna State Opera in 1988, and the Metropolitan Opera in 1991.

Amongst his later roles is Rocco in Fidelio which he has sung at the Santa Fe Opera Festival (2014), the Maggio Musicale (2015), and the Teatro Colón (2016).

Hemm was formerly married to the English soprano Amanda Roocroft.
