= Burgruine Mödling =

Castle ruin in Lower Austria

- Lower Austria, Austria
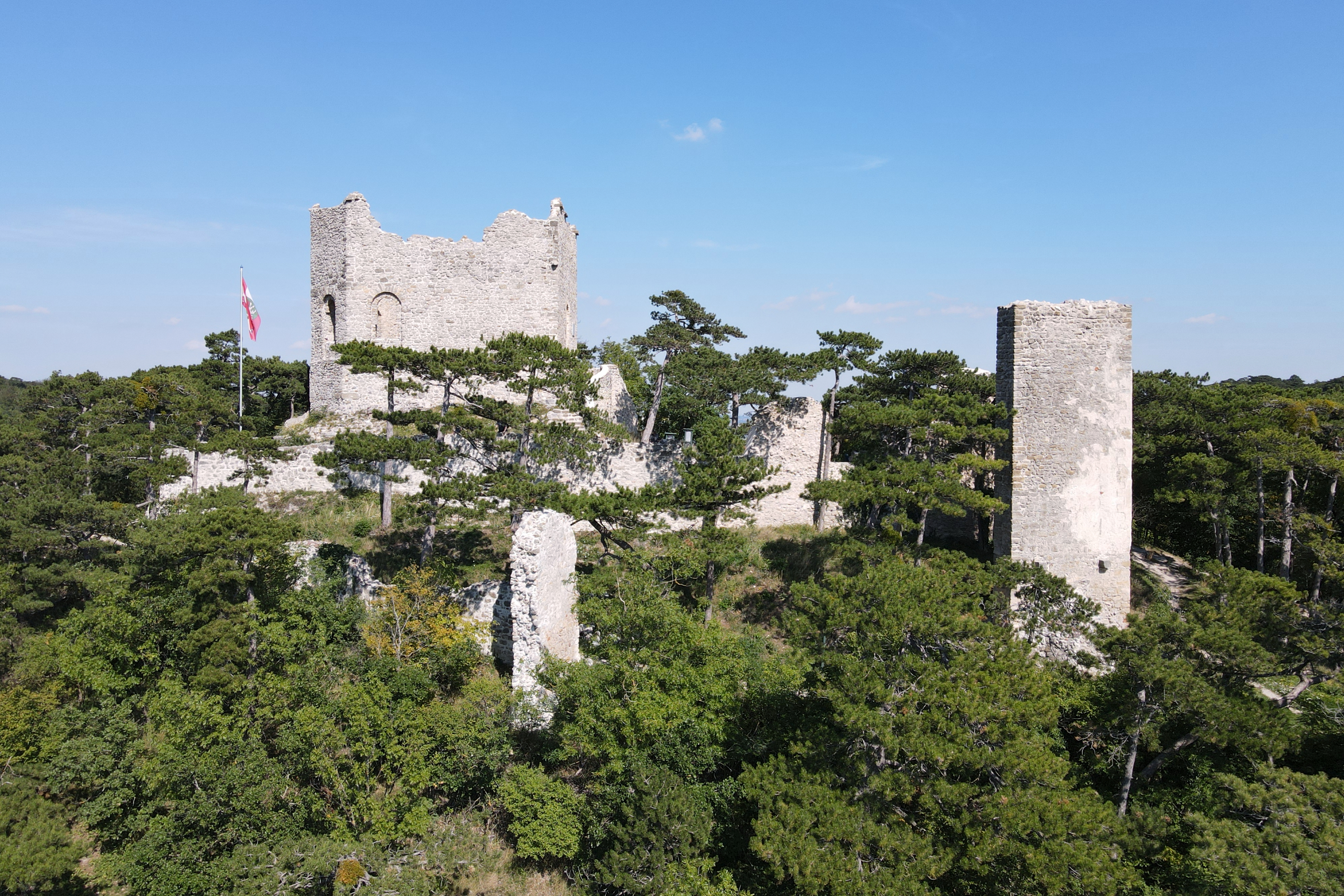
- Southwest view of the Mödling castle ruins

Site information
- Type: hill castle
- Condition: ruins

Location
- Coordinates: 48.079444°N 16.2675°E

Burgruine Mödling is a castle ruin in Mödling, Austria. The former hill castle sits at 259 metres (850 ft) above sea level.

== See also ==
- List of castles in Austria
