= Gerhard W. Weber =

Austrian anthropologist and university teacher

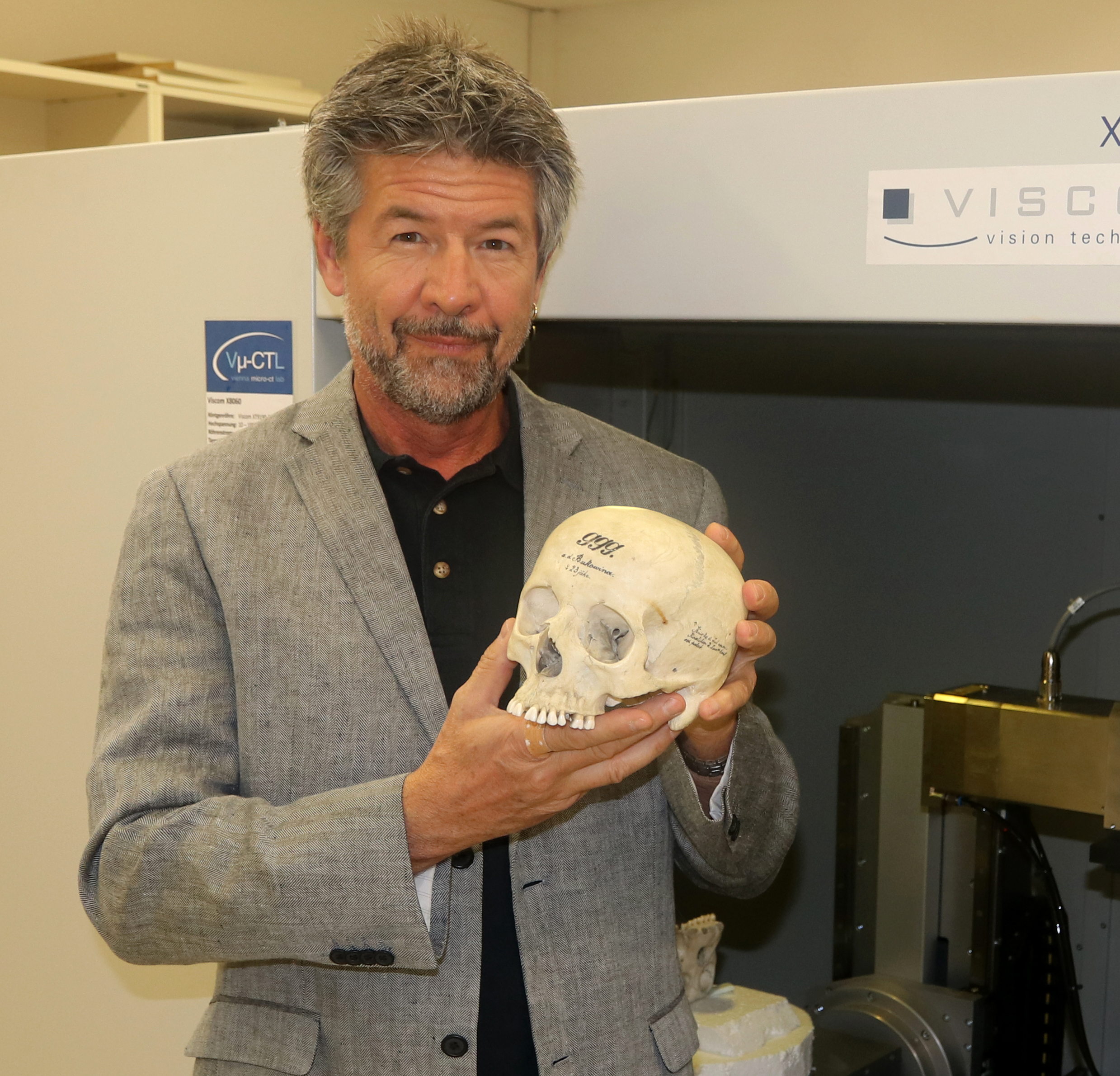
- Born: 29 August 1961 (age 65); Mödling, Austria
- Education: University of Vienna
- Occupation: Paleoanthropologist
- Organization(s): Human Evolution and Archaeological Sciences, European Society for the Study of Human Evolution
- Known for: Virtual Anthropology

Gerhard W. Weber (born 29 August 1961) is an Austrian paleoanthropologist and a founding member of the research network Human Evolution and Archaeological Sciences (HEAS) as well as the European Society for the Study of Human Evolution (ESHE). Weber is a professor at the University of Vienna's Department of Evolutionary Anthropology. He is best known for his application of virtual anthropology to early Homo sapiens and Neanderthals in Europe and the Levant. Weber also determined the origin of the Venus of Willendorf.

== Biography ==
Weber was born August 29, 1961, in Mödling. He took his Matura at the Vienna Business School. After completing his military service, he studied human biology and zoology at the University of Vienna and graduated with a Doctor of Philosophy in human biology. He became a member of the Tyrolean Iceman Research Consortium in 1992.

Weber habilitated in 2001 and became associate professor at the Department of Anthropology in Vienna, where he founded the workgroup Virtual Anthropology. He initiated the first electronic archive for hominin fossils, the Digital archive of Fossil Hominoids, and became its chief editor in 2002. From 2000 to 2005 he was field and co-director of Plio-Pleistocene fieldwork at Galili, Ethiopia.

In 2005 Weber was appointed head of the Vienna micro-CT Lab and acted as deputy head of the Department of Anthropology, University of Vienna until 2012. Between 2006 and 2009 he initiated and coordinated the European Virtual Anthropology Network (EVAN). The network teaches researchers in virtual anthropology.

After a visit to Tel Aviv University in 2012, a collaboration developed with Israel Hershkovitz and his team to work on Late to Middle Pleistocene hominins at the crossroads of Africa, Asia, and Europe.

In 2019, Weber was appointed full professor for anthropology at the University of Vienna, as well as head of the Department of Evolutionary Anthropology. Weber also became head of the research network Human Evolution and Archaeological Sciences (HEAS) in 2021. For his research on the Venus of Willendorf, Weber received the 2022 Science Award from the government of Lower Austria.

== Scientific work ==
Weber has dedicated most of his career to the computer-aided study of morphology and functional anatomy of hominin fossils, recent humans, and their closest relatives. One of his first significant contributions was in auxology, describing the relationship of adult human body height to month of birth for the first time. Weber’s paleoanthropological work reaches from field work in Pliocene sediments in Ethiopia over Australopithecine studies in South Africa to Upper Paleolithic Europeans when three-dimensional digital models of teeth found in the Grotta del Cavallo were examined, originally thought to be Neanderthal teeth. However, the analysis by Weber and the research team in 2011 showed that they were deciduous teeth of very early European modern humans. Weber continued work on early modern humans, particularly Israeli fossils from Manot Cave and Misliya Cave, one of the earliest Homo sapiens out of Africa (~185,000 years ago). In addition, Weber and a research team examined archaeological finds from Nesher-Ramla in Israel. These were dated to an age of 130,000 years and showed that precursors of Neanderthals existed earlier than assumed in countries along the eastern Mediterranean. In addition, the team found that the Nesher-Ramla hominin was not a classic Neanderthal, but a previously unknown type of human. One of Weber’s archaeological publications concerns the re-examination of the Ephesos skull, which was not only scientifically acknockwledged but also featured in several print and online media. He and his team were able to demonstrate that the Ephesos skull, which had long been presumed to be Cleopatra’s sister Arsionoe IV’s, in fact belonged to an unknown boy at the age of 11 – 14 years at death with severe developmentat defects.

=== Virtual anthropology ===
For his research, Weber uses virtual anthropology, which stands for the digital approach that replaces traditional anthropological methods. He published a textbook in this discipline, and organized the global distribution of the knowledge to researchers in the European Virtual Anthropology Network. With the use of micro-computed tomography, skulls as well as small findings such as teeth or artefacts could be analysed in high resolution.

After co-developing a specialised micro-CT machine, Weber employed the technology for the description of one of the first modern humans in Europe from Qesem cave in Israel, the earliest modern humans discovered out-of-Africa. The micro-CT machine was specifically made for Weber, because regular medical computer tomographs were not detailed enough for his purposes. Weber was able to clarify the true origin of the Venus of Willendorf through this machine.

=== Venus of Willendorf ===
The material from the 30,000-year-old Venus of Willendorf, discovered in 1908, was examined by Weber and geologists Alexander Lukeneder and Mathias Harzhauser as well as the prehistorian Walpurga Antl-Weiser. The eleven-centimetre Venus was X-rayed using the new method of micro-computed tomography. This showed that the figurine had been made of the sedimentary rock oolite. Microscopic comparative analyses from Austria and all over Europe showed that this material is only congruent with the oolite deposit near Lake Garda. The new finding derived from this is that humans were able to travel greater distances even 30,000 years ago.

== Selected publications ==
- Weber, Gerhard W.; Šimková, Petra G.; Fernandes, Daniel M.; Cheronet, Olivia; Úry, Előd; Wilfing, Harald; Matiasek, Katarina; Llano-Lizcano, Alejandro; Gelabert, Pere; Trinks, Immo; Douka, Katerina; Ladstätter, Sabine; Higham, Tom; Steskal, Martin; Pinhasi, Ron (2025). "The cranium from the Octagon in Ephesos". Scientific Reports. 15 (1): 943. https://doi.org/10.1038/s41598-024-83870-x
- Weber, G. W. (2023). "Quantum Leaps in Human Biocultural Evolution and the Relationship to Cranial Capacity". Life (Basel, Switzerland), 13 (4), 1030. https://doi.org/10.3390/life13041030.
- Weber, G. W., Lukeneder, A., Harzhauser, M., Mitteroecker, P., Wurm, L., Hollaus, L. M., Kainz, S., Haack, F., Antl-Weiser, W., & Kern, A. (2022). "The microstructure and the origin of the Venus from Willendorf". Scientific reports, 12 (1), 2926. https://doi.org/10.1038/s41598-022-06799-z.
- Weber, G. W. (2015). "Virtual Anthropology. Yearbook of Physical Anthropology". https://doi.org/10.1002/ajpa.22658.
- Weber, G.W. and Bookstein, F.L. (2011) "Virtual Anthropology: A Guide to a New Interdisciplinary Field". https://doi.org/10.1007/978-3-211-49347-2_1
- Ryan, T. M., Burney, D. A., Godfrey, L. R., GÃ¶hlich, U. B., Jungers, W. L., Vasey, N., Ramilisonina, Walker, A., & Weber, G. W. (2008). A reconstruction of the Vienna skull of Hadropithecus stenognathus. Proceedings of the National Academy of Sciences of the United States of America, 105(31), 10699-10702. doi: https://doi.org/10.1073/pnas.0805195105.
- Weber, G. W., Seidler, H., Macchiarelli, R., Bondioli, L., Faupl, P., Richter, W., Kullmers, O., Sandrock, O., & Falk, D. (2001). New discovery of Australopithecus in the Somali region of Ethiopia. American Journal of Physical Anthropology, S32, 162. Accession Number: WOS:000167358000507
- Weber, G. W., Prossinger, H., & Seidler, H. (1998). "Height depends on month of birth". Nature, 391 (6669), 754–755. https://doi.org/10.1038/35781.
