= Bruno Liberda =

Austrian composer

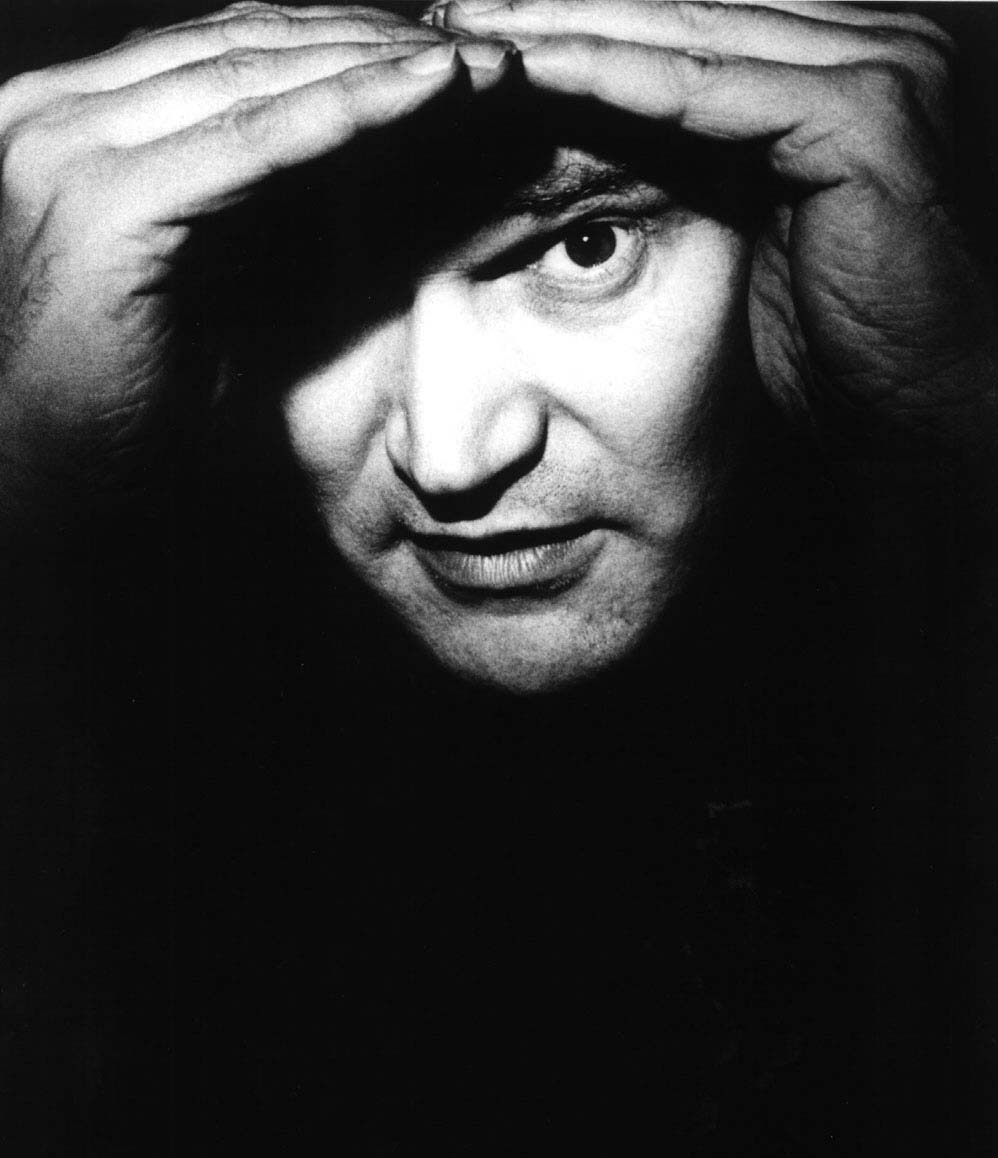
Bruno Liberda

Bruno Liberda (born 17 February 1953, in Mödling, Vienna) is an Austrian composer of contemporary classical music.

== Life ==
Liberda started his academic and musical education when he was 16. He studied composition under Alfred Uhl at the Universität für Musik und Darstellende Kunst Wien. Later, he studied under Roman Haubenstock-Ramati, who became his most influential teacher and mentor.
He received several awards and scholarships in Europe & US. Today Liberda lectures electronic music at the Universität für Musik und Darstellende Kunst Wien.
His ballet Valse triste (1978) was the first composition of electronic music ever to be performed in the Staatsoper Wien. By combining traditional and electronic instruments, he explores the fascination of music as so aptly described by Józef Maria Hoene-Wroński: Music is the corporealisation of the intelligence that is in sound.
His scores are often the result of process-oriented, non-linear composing. Traditional notation, optical stimulation and integration of graphical & verbal description are key elements of his attempt to describe sound in a very direct way.

== Compositions ==
Stage

- Yerma, ballet (1977)

• Valse triste, ballet (1978)
• Das Ende des Kreises, opera (1981)
• Shambhala, opera (1989)
• The Northern Lights, ballet (1991)
• Wieso verschwindet Mozart auf der Reise nach Prag?, opera (1999)
• das kleine ei das detektivin werden wollte, opera (2007)
• Celestina, opera (2009)

Compositions (extract)
• 1974: Berenice
• 1974: Albumblätter für die Toten
• 1976: Ich hab mein Sach auf Nichts gestellt, String quartett
• 1977: Ein trauerumflorter Tag sinkt aus den Glocken
• 1979: Songs for Mizzi Traktor, mixed media
• 1978: Turn slowly, 2 Pianos
• 1979: ... con variazioni, Piano
• 1980: A se stesso, Tape music
• 1982: Ein kleines Requiem, Tape music
• 1982: Die, die Last des Himmels tragen, Choir
• 1983: Sophisticated Atmosphere, Music for Orchestra and Brass Band
• 1985: Il solito, ma non troppo, Piano
• 1986: Kyrie, Choir and Chamber Orchestra
• 1986: Horoscopical Music, 8-16 instruments
• 1986: 100 Ansichten vom Berge Fuji 3rd book/2, Orchestra
• 1986: 100 Ansichten vom Berge Fuji 1st book/1, cello, marimba, vibr., piano
• 1986: Rest zweier tragischer Szenen, 2 violoncelli
• 1987: 100 Ansichten vom Berge Fuji 1.Buch/5, 7-11 voice
• 1988: Good Feeling on Sunday Morning, 1 piano, 2 pianists
• 1988: String Quartet on G and B
• 1990: 100 Ansichten vom Berge Fuji 2nd book /2, tape music
• 1990: Capricci, Concert for 6 pianos, orchestra and tape
• 1993: 100 Ansichten vom Berge Fuji 1st book /11, voice and live electronics
• 1994: Kleines Triptychon, voice and live electronics
• 1994: Nach(t)laut, Chamber orchestra and electronics
• 1995: In stiller Sonne, sound installation
• 1996: Seven steps, concert for piano and tape
• 1999: Getsemani2000, sound installation
• 2001: un&sichtbar (in&visible), exhibition
• 2003: JETZT, mixed media
• 2004 I.P. Installation, Gallery tonArt, Vienna [1]
• 2007: neunmal gefärbt, piano, mixed media
• 2008 siebenmal gefärbt, prestudy for opera (2008)
• 2010: a sphere of air is bound, brass instrument and live electronics
• 2011: self-portrait without self, zither and live electronics
• 2012: Buddha cannot sit quietly anymore, voice, obi-gong and live electronics
• 2021: mozarts letztes blatt
• 2021: in stiller sonne
• 2021: fermentarium
• 2021: Ton aus Strom
