= Ernst Heeger =

Austrian amateur entomologist

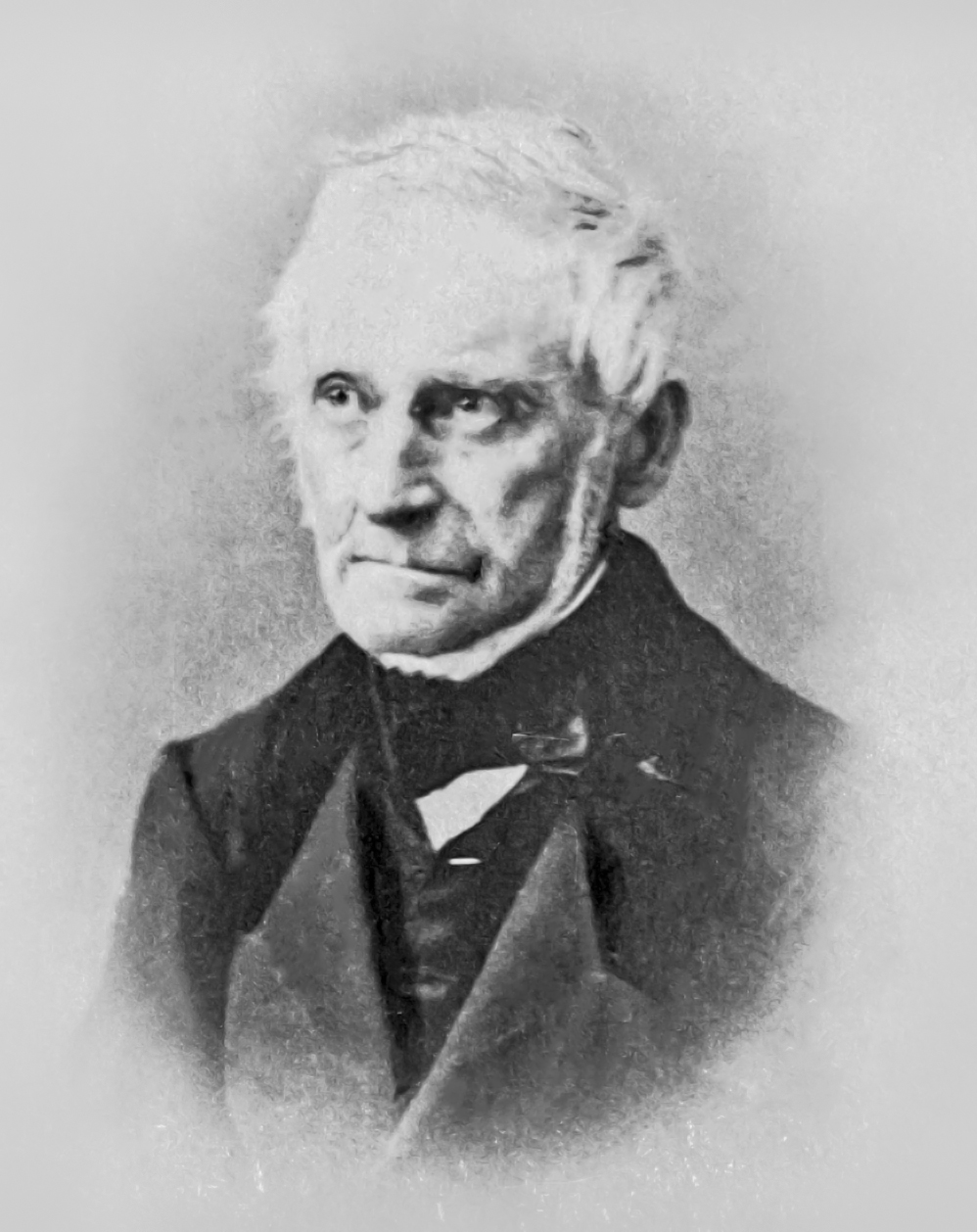
Ernst Heeger

Ernst Heeger (1783 in Perchtoldsdorf – 1866 in Laxenburg), was an Austrian amateur entomologist. He was a graduate of the Academy of Fine Arts in Vienna, a "Privatcadet" in the Napoleonic Wars, and from 1816 an employee of the Magistrat (administrative authority) of Vienna Later he founded a school of languages and drawing in Mödling. As an entomologist, he was particularly interested in the biology of insects and in the benefits and damage caused by insects. He collaborated with Vincenz Kollar.He published a series of entomology works entitled Beiträge zur Naturgeschichte der Insecten and he was a pioneer of micrography publishing Album microscopisch-photographischer Darstellungen aus dem Gebiete der Zoologie between 1861 and 1863.
