= Mödling =

City in Lower Austria near Vienna

- Municipality
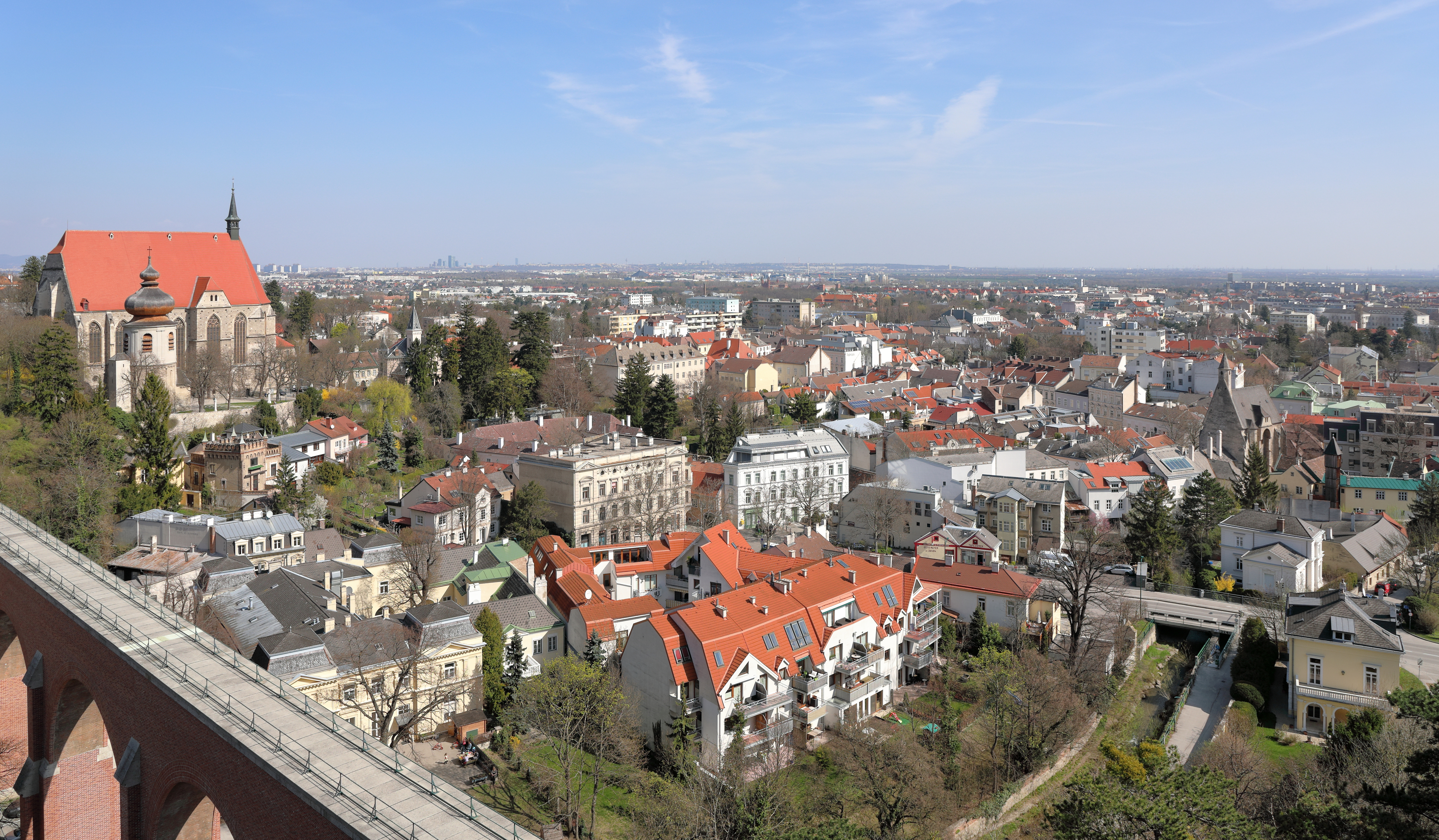
- Mödling

- Coat of arms
- Map of Mödling
- Location within Austria
- Coordinates: 48°5′N 16°16′E
- Country: Austria
- State: Lower Austria
- District: Mödling

Government
  - Mayor: Silvia Drechsler (SPÖ)

Area
  - Total: 10.04 km^{2} (3.88 sq mi)
- Elevation: 246 m (807 ft)

Population (2018-01-01)
  - Total: 20,555
  - Density: 2,047/km^{2} (5,303/sq mi)
- Time zone: UTC+1 (CET)
  - Summer (DST): UTC+2 (CEST)
- Postal code: 2340, 2342
- Area code: 02236
- Website: www.moedling.at

Mödling (German pronunciation: [ˈmøːdlɪŋ]) is the capital of the Austrian district of the same name located approximately 15 km south of Vienna.

Mödling lies in Lower Austria's industrial zone (Industrieviertel). The Mödlingbach, a brook which rises in the Vienna Woods, flows through the town. Near Achau it joins with the Schwechat. Woodland occupies a large part of the municipality, part of the Föhrenberge ('Pine Mountains').

Located immediately south of Vienna, and within the boundaries of the district of Mödling, is one of the largest shopping centres in Europe: Shopping City Süd (SCS).

== Geography ==
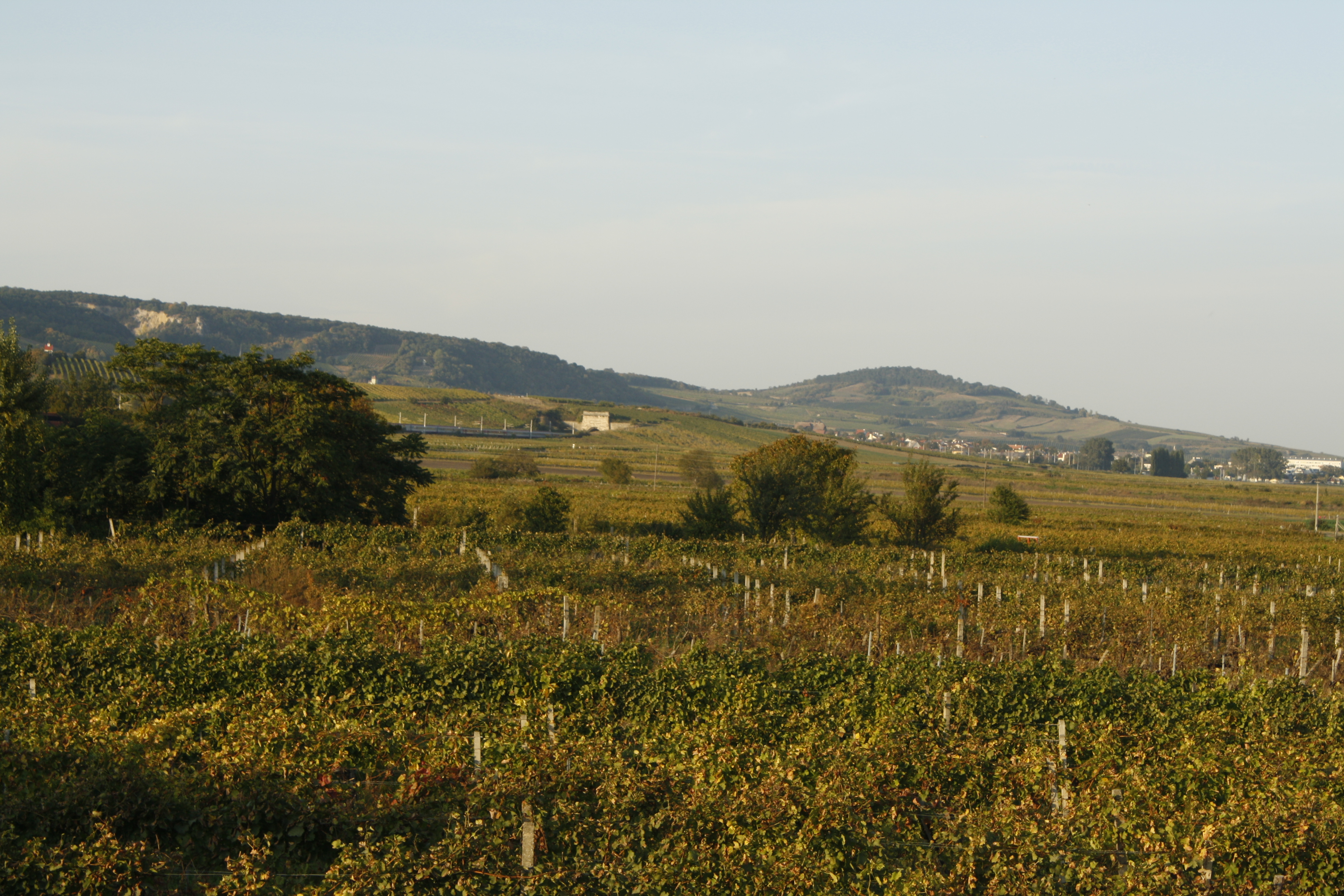
The Eichkogel view from Pfaffstätten.

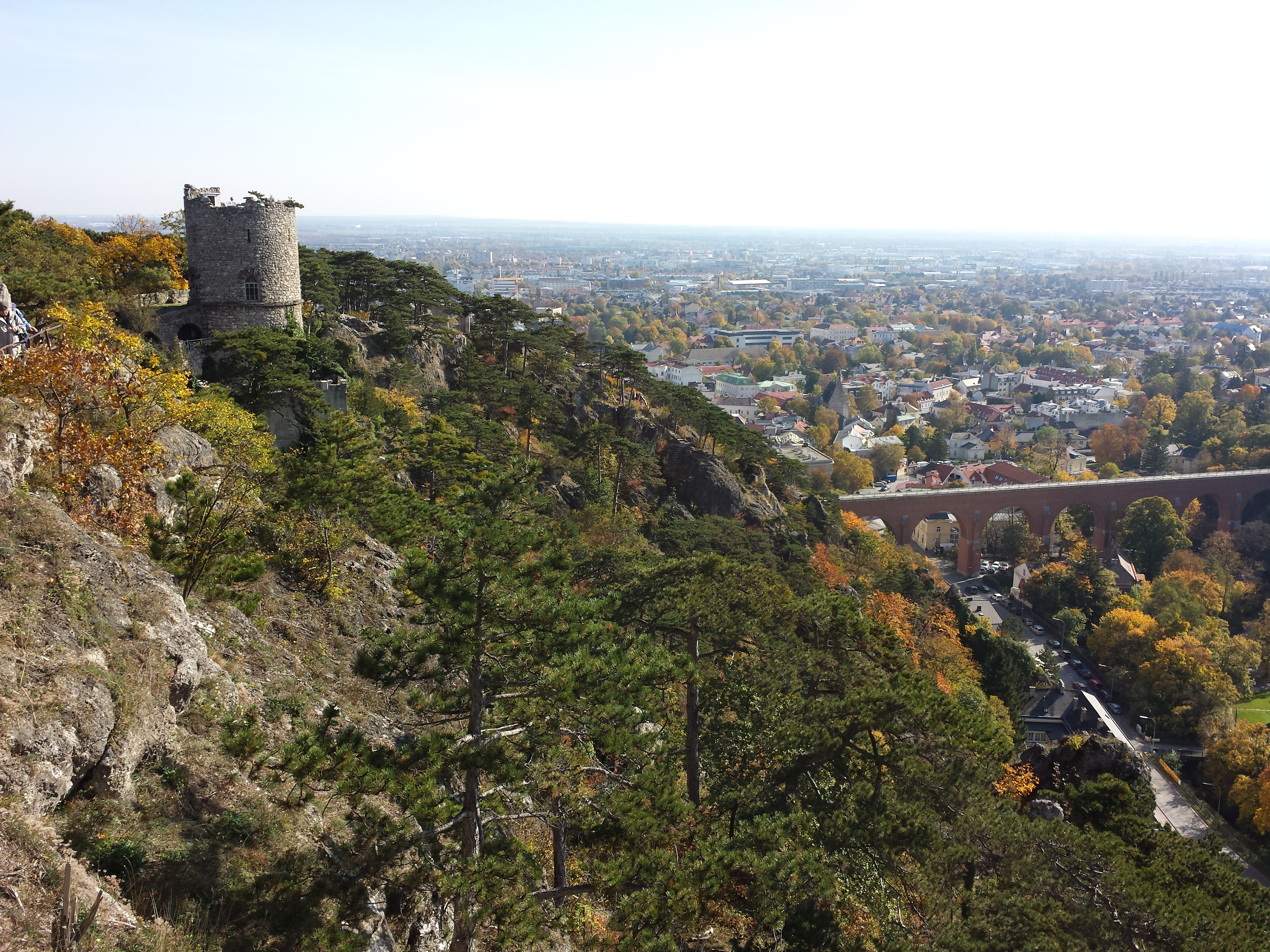
View over parts of Mödling

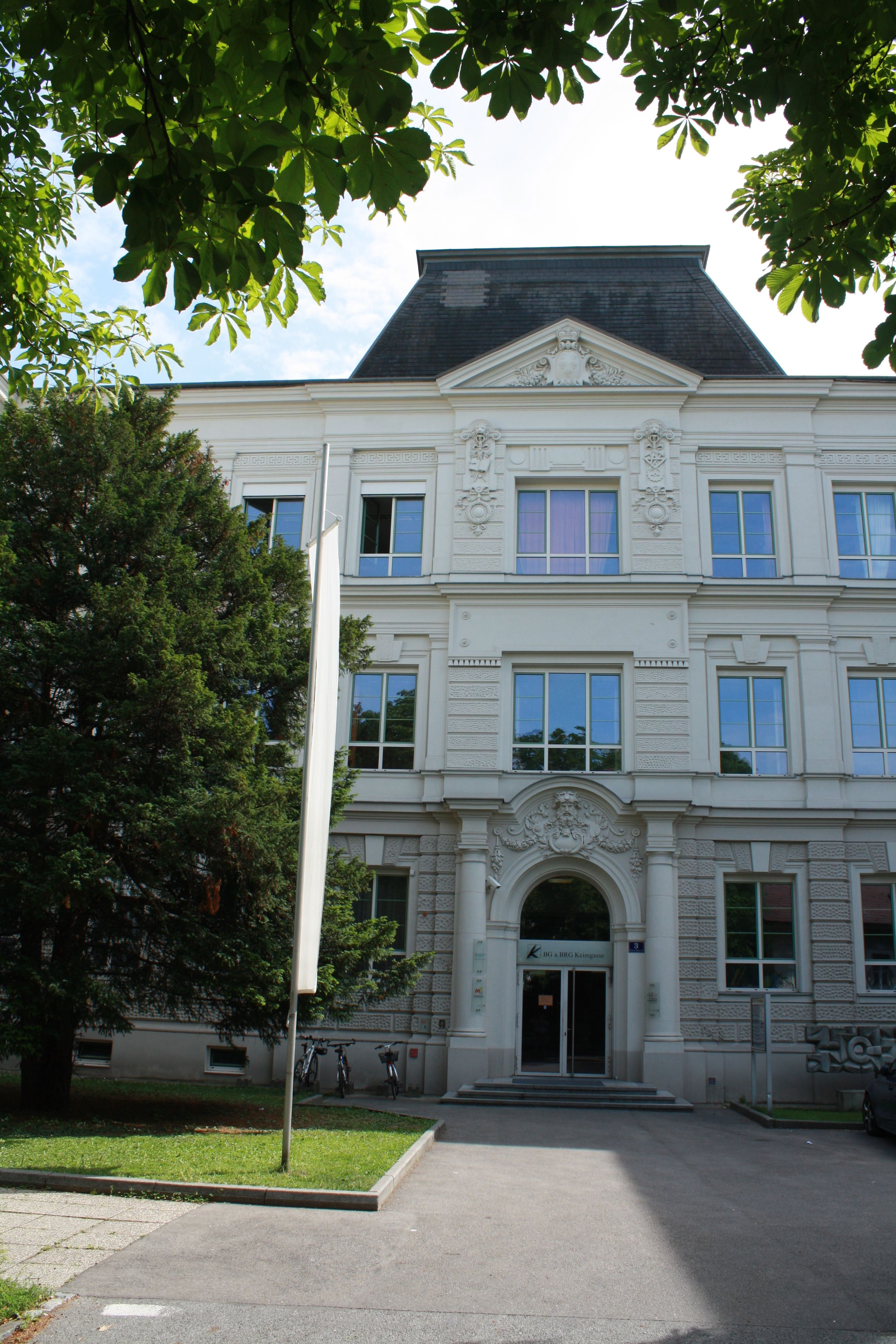
The entrance of one of Mödling's high schools

Grapes are grown on the slopes of the Wienerwald; the area is called Thermenregion, where one can find much Heurigen (the most recent year's wine).

Wiener Neudorf to the east, and Maria Enzersdorf to the north, merge directly into Mödling. South of Mödling is Gumpoldskirchen, separated by the Eichkogel with its very special flora. In the west, a narrow street runs through Vorderbrühl, formally a village in its own rights, and leads to Hinterbrühl. This narrow valley is called Klausen, above it the remains of the Mödling castle, once belonging to the Babenberger, the then-ruling family. On the other side of the Klausen is the Kalenderberg, with the castle of Liechtenstein on its far side. The beginning of the Klausen is marked by the large red-brick aqueduct of the Erste Wiener Hochquellenwasserleitung. The steep, rocky valley sides of the Naturpark Föhrenberge grow the typical Wienerwald-Schwarzföhren (the austriaca form of the European Black Pine, Pinus nigra).

== History ==
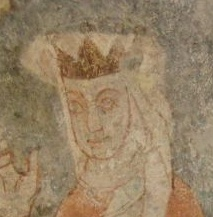
Richsa Česká fresco ca. 1252

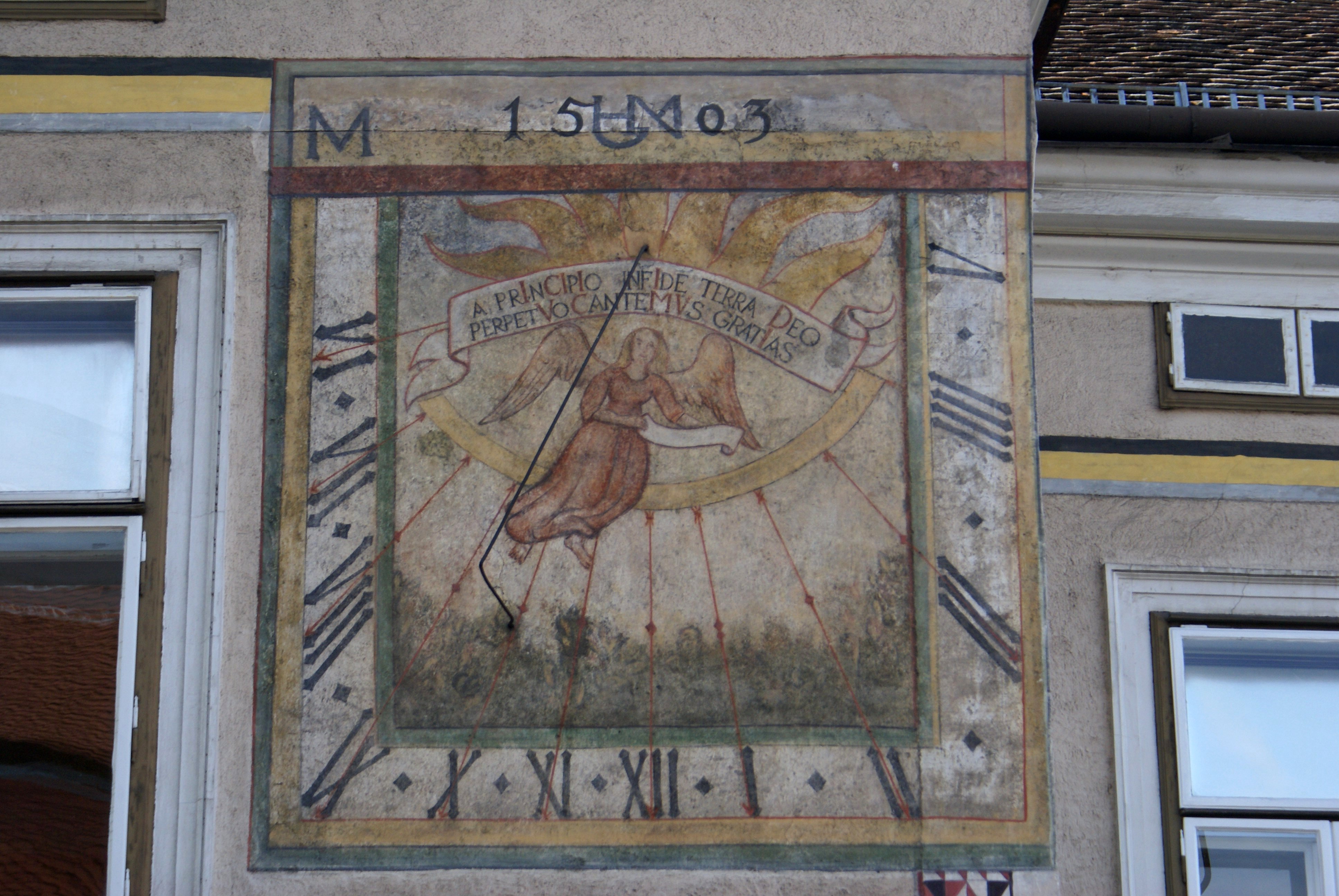
A sundial on an old building on Freiheitsplatz (Freedom Square). The sundial is originally from the year 1503, as indicated by the painting.

The settlement dates back to the Neolithic era. Through the centuries, the name of the town evolved from Medilihha to Medelikch, Medling and, finally, Mödling. These names trace back to old Slavic meaning 'slowly running water'.

Today there is a quaint old town with a pedestrian area. The town was the residence of a branch of the Babenberg family, as a result of which it received the nickname Babenbergerstadt ('Town of the Babenbergs').

Traces of the first settlements of the Hallstatt culture from the Neolithic era were found on the Kalenderberg. Roman coins and a Roman burial site have been found near today's railway station.

After Charlemagne's victory in 803 AD against the Avars, the area around Mödling was settled by settlers from Bavaria. About 500 Avar graves were found in the area of the "Goldene Stiege" (very close to today's old city).

The first ancient document mentioning "MEDILIHHA ULTRA MONTEM COMMIGENIUM" is dated 8 September 903, when two bishops (of the then Roman Catholic church) exchanged lands. However, in 907 the settlement seems to have been destroyed again. After the Battle of Lechfeld settlement in the area of today's Mödling started again.

After this, for some time Mödling housed a relative of the then ruling House of Babenberg. In 1177, Henry the Elder, son of Henry II Jasomirgott, became landlord in an area reaching from Liesing to Piesting and Bruck an der Leitha. You can read this in old documents kept in the nearby monastery of Heiligenkreuz. In Henry's days arts and culture dominated in the castle of Mödling; the famous minnesinger Walther von der Vogelweide stayed there more than once. The Spitalkirche and today's St. Othmar were built in the 15th century, the Karner (charnel house) in the 12th.

Even in these times, Mödling grew grapes; after Langenlois, it was the largest grape-growing community in Lower Austria.

In 1343, Duke Albrecht II granted the rights of a market town to Mödling.

In 1529, the Ottomans devastated Mödling for the first time during their first siege of Vienna. In 1679, many citizens died of the Black Death. When the Ottomans came again in 1683, almost all the citizens of Mödling were killed. The second epidemic of the Black Death only brought death to 22 inhabitants, hence the survivors built the monument of the Holy Trinity (Dreifaltigkeits- or Pestsäule) at the Freiheitsplatz.

In the early 19th century, Ludwig van Beethoven often visited his favorite pub, the Two Ravens (now defunct) in Mödling.

Arnold Schoenberg lived in Mödling between 1918 and 1925, and invented his twelve-tone technique of composition there.

On 18 November 1875, Mödling was designated a city.

From 1883 to 1932, Mödling was the starting point of the Mödling and Hinterbrühl Tram, Austria's first electric railway and world's first long-lasting tram with overhead lines.

In 1938, after the Anschluss with Nazi Germany, Mödling was incorporated into the newly formed 24th District of Vienna. In 1954, it became once again a part of Lower Austria.

On May 30, 2023, 3 people were killed by fire at the local hospital.

== Population ==
Historical population

Year	Pop.	±%
1900	15,113	—
1910	18,067	+19.5%
1923	18,677	+3.4%
1934	18,736	+0.3%
1939	18,400	−1.8%
1951	17,076	−7.2%

Year	Pop.	±%
1961	17,274	+1.2%
1971	18,835	+9.0%
1981	19,276	+2.3%
1991	20,290	+5.3%
2001	20,411	+0.6%
2010	20,426	+0.1%

== Politics ==
Members of the regional council:
Wahl	ÖVP	Grüne	SPÖ	NEOS/LIF	FPÖ	WIR	BMK	M 2000
1975	18		16		3			
1979	15		19		3			
1985	17	1	14		1	4		
1990	15	1	10		2	9		
1995	16	2	8	4	4	7		
2000	15	5	10	1	4	5		1
2005	18	7	12		2	2		
2010	19	8	9		3	1	1	
2015	18	10	8		4	1		
2020	16	11	8	3	2	1		
2025	12	11	10	3	4	1		

Members of the city-government:
Wahl	ÖVP	Grüne	SPÖ	NEOS/LIF	FPÖ	WIR	BMK	M 2000
2015	6	3	2		1			
2020	6	4	3	1				
2025	3	3	3	1	1			

^{1} 2020 as NEOS, formerly LIF
^{2} Wir für Mödling – Eva Maier
^{3} Bürgerliste Michael Kanyka
^{4} Wir für Mödling, formerly Liste Pepi Wagner
^{5} Mödling 2000
^{6} The size of regional council is 41.
^{7} The size of city government could vary between 9 and 14.

== Traffic ==
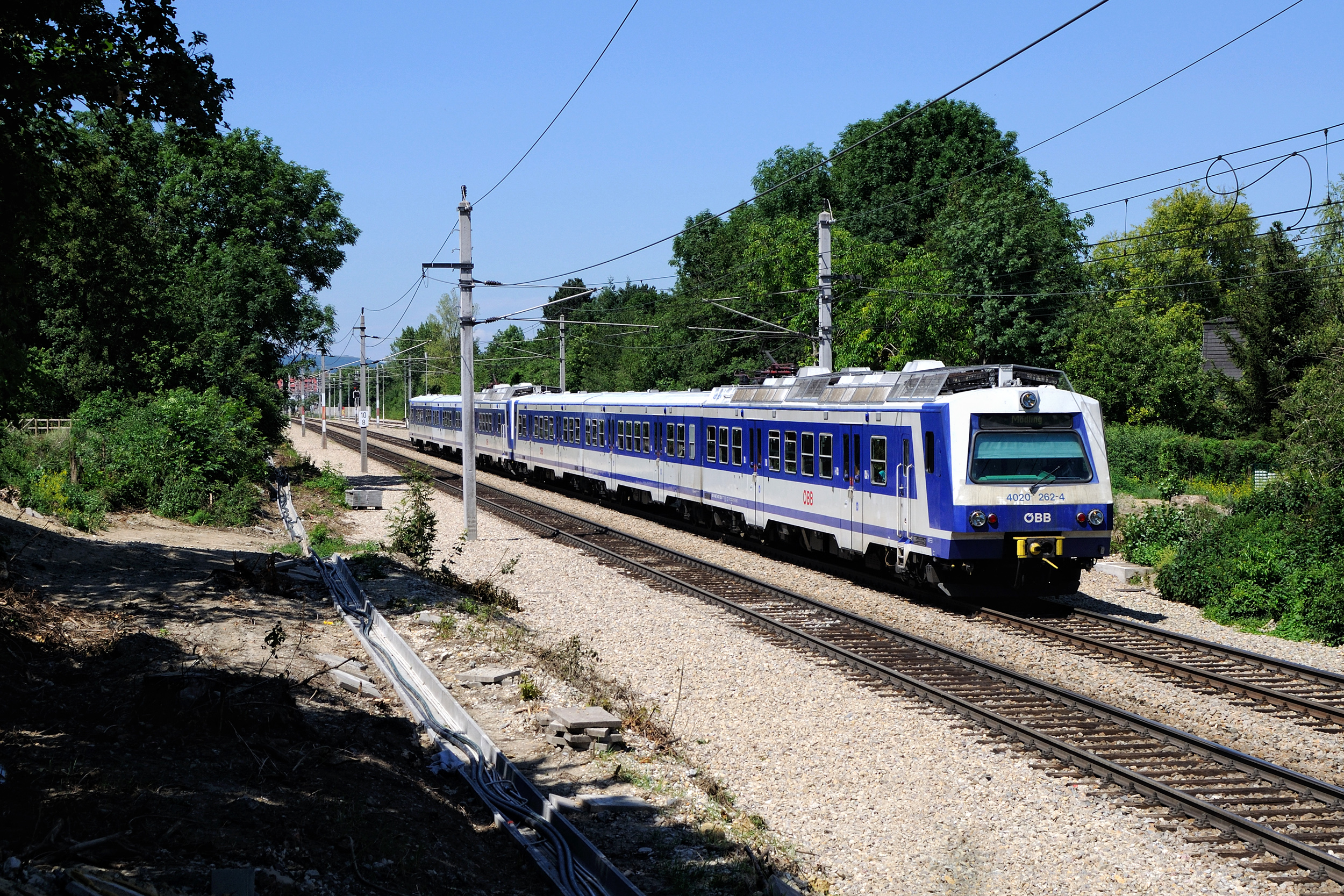
Commuter train of Line S2 on the way to Mödling ÖBB Class 4020

Mödling functions as a traffic hub for its direct vicinity. Bus lines connect the town and Südbahn with the surrounding areas. The Südbahn connects Mödling to Vienna, but also to other local centers like Wiener Neustadt by commuter trains.

Many bus lines end/start at Mödling's railway station: Most of them lead to Vienna (with different ways) (207, 259, 260, 265, 266, 269, 270...) but also other villages in the district are destinations: Gießhübel (262), Hinterbrühl, Gaaden... (364, 365), Guntramsdorf (363) and many more.

The closest airport is Vienna International Airport.

The town lies close to several major motorways (A2, A23, S1).

Until the 1960s, the town was connected to the tram system of Vienna though the line 360 was discontinued after the commuter train system was introduced on the Südbahn. Historically, Mödling was the site of Austria's first electrified tram line, which had mainly touristic use.

== Economy ==
In the old days, because of the rail-connection to the north/Vienna and to the south, several large industries had their plants here. Today most of the firms are SMEs. The larger ones have moved to Wiener Neudorf into the 'Industriezentrum Niederösterreich Süd'.

== Castles ==
The Mödling area in the Vienna Forest contains many old castles (German: Burgen) and ruins. Castle Liechtenstein is the most famous and biggest castle. It was owned by the wealthy family who later founded the country of the same name. Opposite the castle is Schloss Liechtenstein (Maria Enzersdorf), a former summer residence of the princely Liechtenstein family. Burgruine Mödling also stands nearby and is one of the oldest ruins in the area. It dates back to the 11th century. In addition, Black Tower (Schwarzer Turm) looks out over downtown Mödling from the Calendar mountains. It was built over 200 years ago, but is still privately occupied to this day. Lastly, on the walk between Black Tower and Castle Liechtenstein, one will come across a 200-year-old amphitheatre nearly buried in the woods. It was built in the same time frame as the Black Tower and served as an important cultural centre for the local Mödling population.

== Culture and sights ==
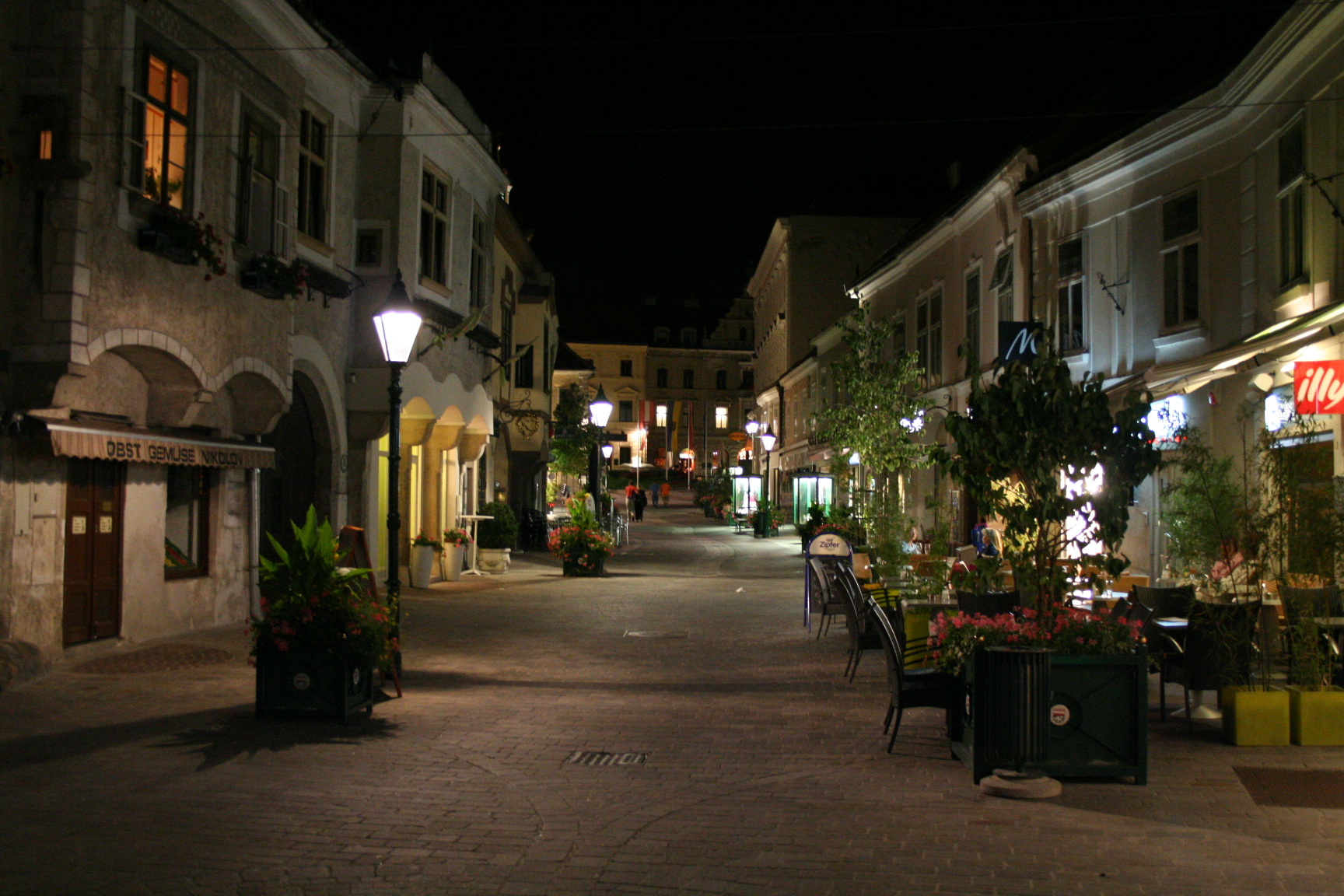
Mödling's pedestrian zone

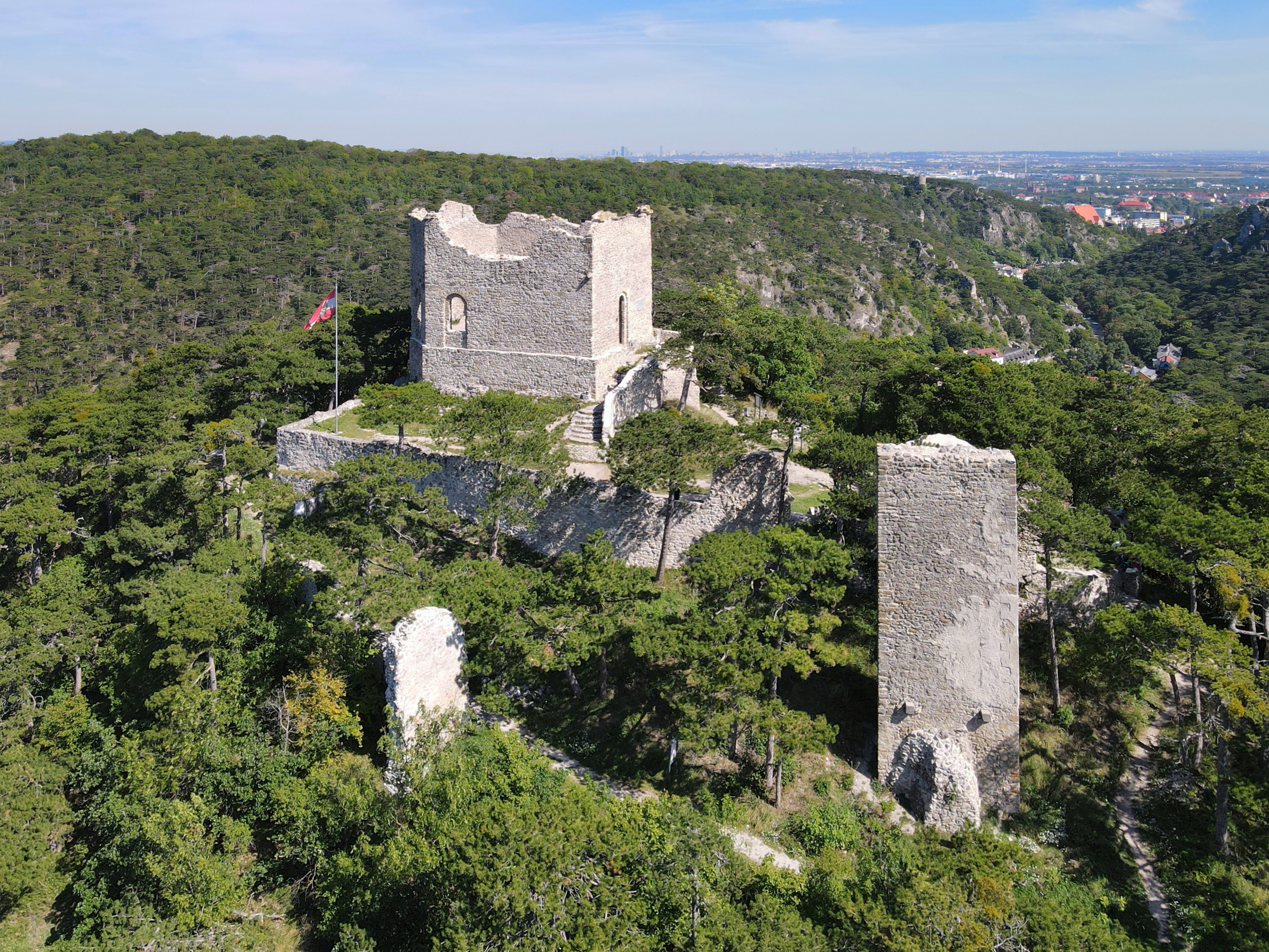
Ruins of the Mödling castle

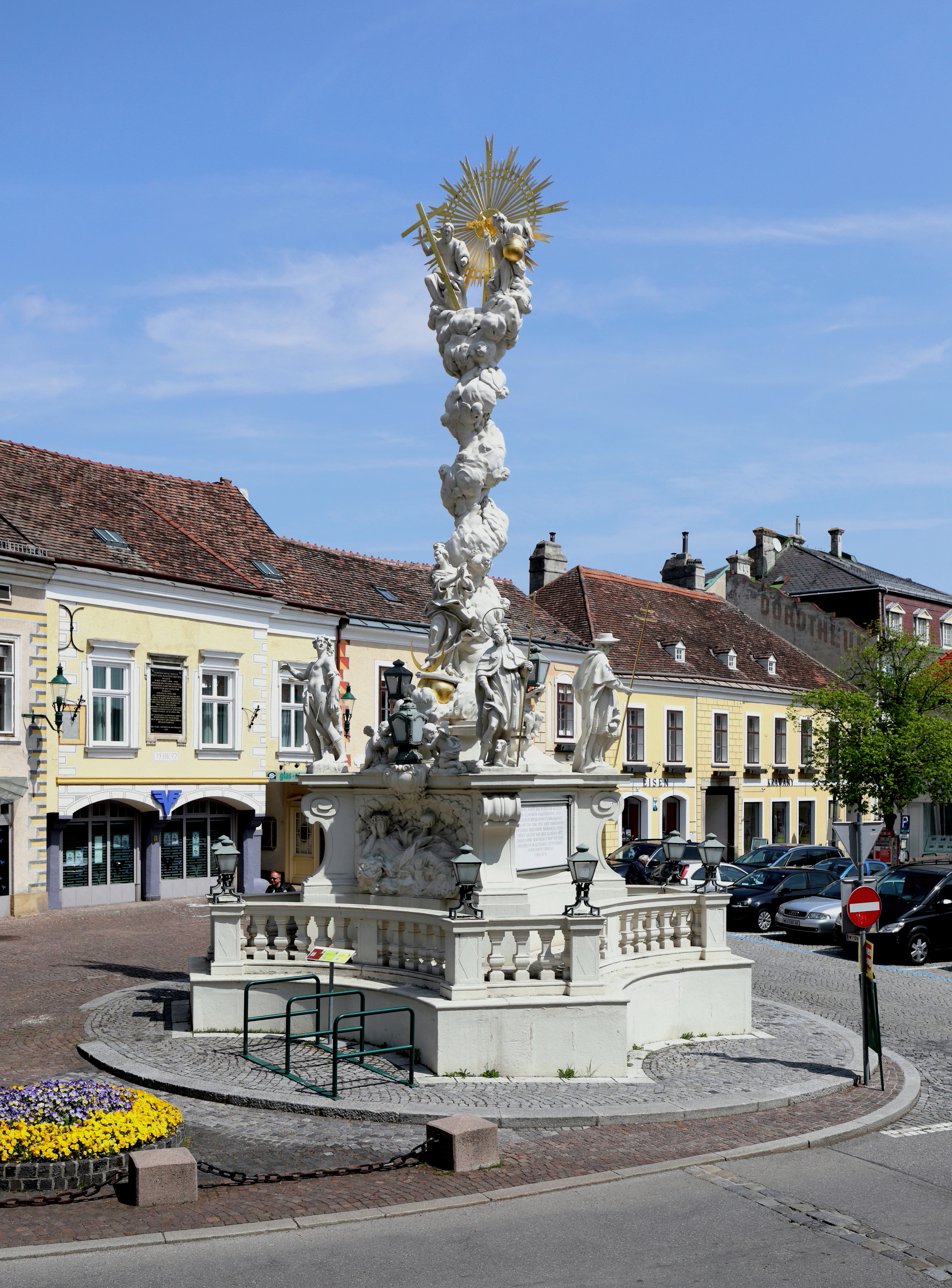
Marian and Holy Trinity column in Mödling

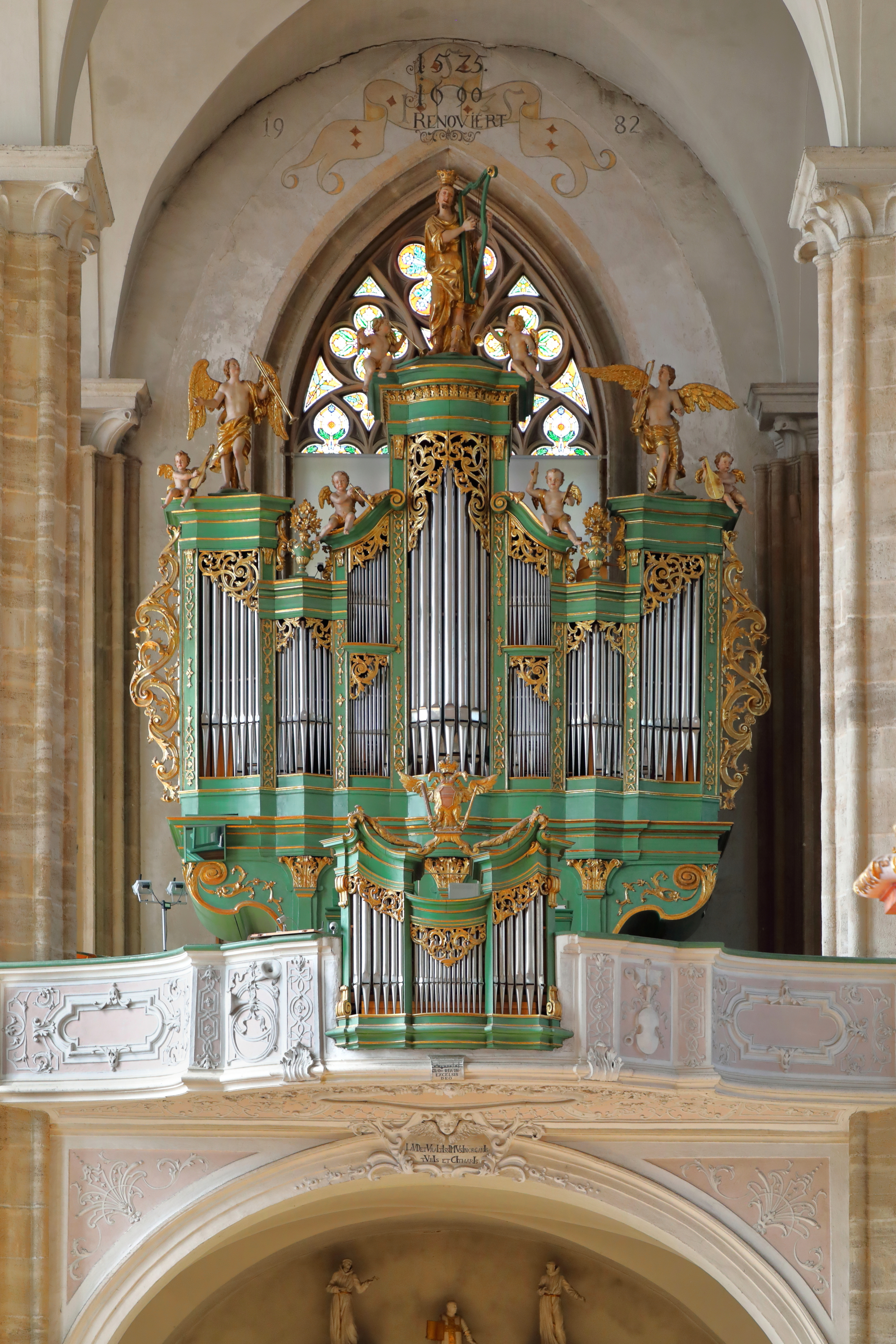
Organ of St. Othmar church

The well-preserved and revitalized Old City is protected by the Hague Convention. The town hall holds the registry office. Because of its lovely environment many couples choose to marry here. Schrannenplatz and Kaiserin-Elisabeth-Strasse were pedestrianised at the very early date of 1976, the first time a 'Bundesstraße' had been declared a pedestrian area.

Nearby is the Eichkogel Nature Reserve, with rare flora, like 'Knollen-Brandkraut' (Phlomoides tuberosa) and others, on 'Halbtrockenrasen'. Among the rocks in the Klausen rare plants grow, like the 'Mödlinger Federnelke' (Dianthus plumarius subsp. neilreichii), which was discovered as late as the middle of the 19th century by the botanist August Neilreich, or the 'Deutsche Alant' (Inula germanica).

=== Buildings ===
- St. Othmar church and charnel
- Spitalkirche
- Ruins of the Mödling castle
- Husarentempel on the top of the 'Kleine Anninger'
- Schwarzer Turm
- Amphitheater

=== Museums ===
- Museum Mödling at Thonetschlössl
- Volkskundemuseum
- Stadtverkehrsmuseum
- Essinger-Haus (where a famous painter used to live)
- Beethoven-Gedenkstätte
- Schönberg-Haus

=== Theatres ===
- Stadttheater
- Bühne Mayer
- Mödlinger Puppenkiste (MÖP)
- Theater im Bunker (in a former air-raid shelter in Vorderbrühl)
- Komödienspiele (summer plays in the Stadttheater)

=== Schools ===
- Elementary and secondary schools
- Bundesgymnasium und Bundesrealgymnasium Franz-Keim-Gasse
- Bundesgymnasium und wirtschaftskundliches Bundesrealgymnasium Untere Bachgasse
- Höhere Technische Bundeslehr- und Versuchsanstalt
- Vienna Business School Mödling, Handelsakademie der Wiener Kaufmannschaft
- Höhere Lehranstalt für Mode & Bekleidungstechnik oder Produktmanagement & Präsentation
- Beethoven Musikschule
- Chorschule der Sängerknaben vom Wienerwald
- Volkshochschule
- Polytechnische Schule

=== Institutions ===
- Bezirkshauptmannschaft
- Finanzamt
- Bezirksgericht
- Veterinärmedizinisches Institut, which has importance beyond the area of Mödling

== Notable citizens ==
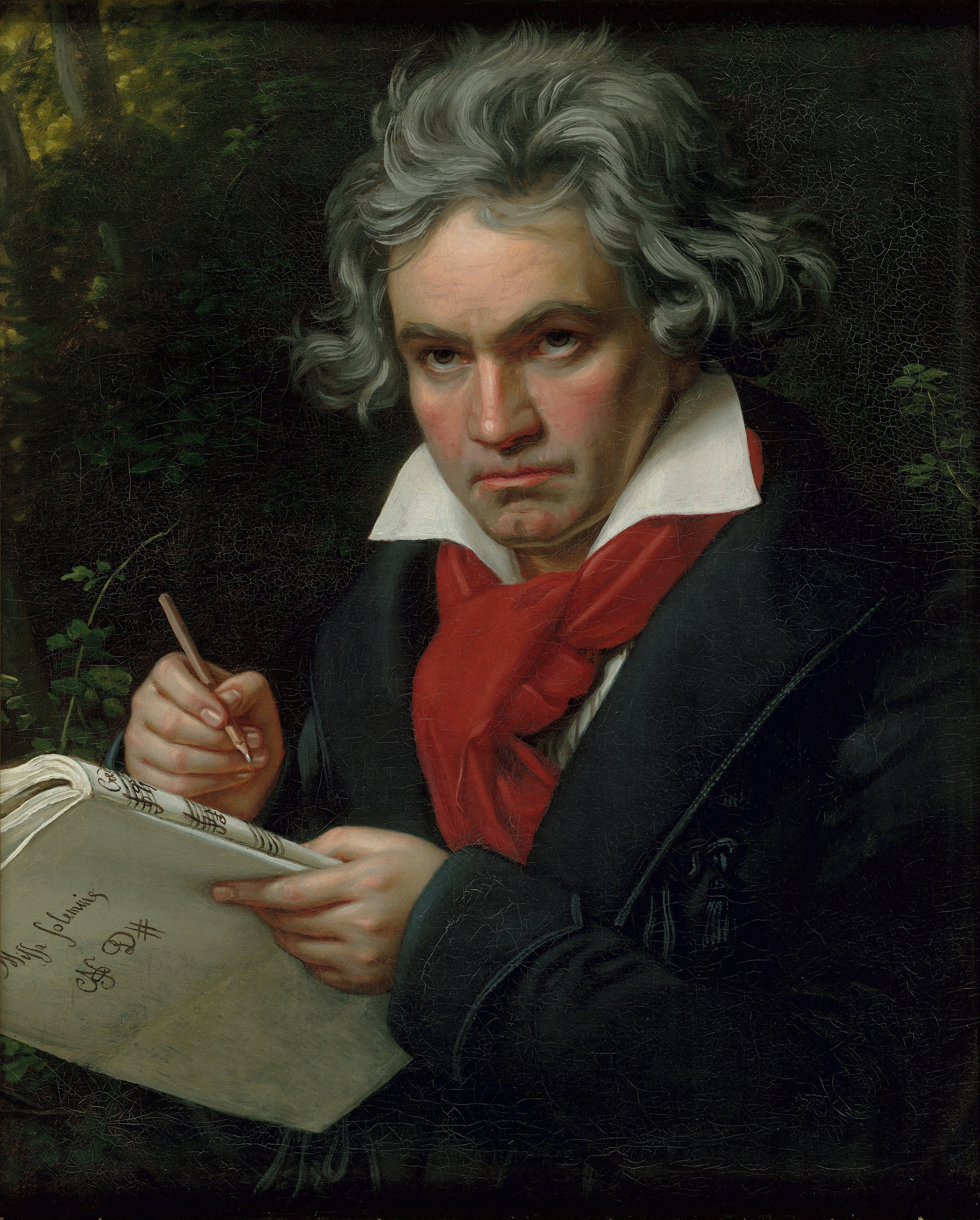
Ludwig van Beethoven, 1820

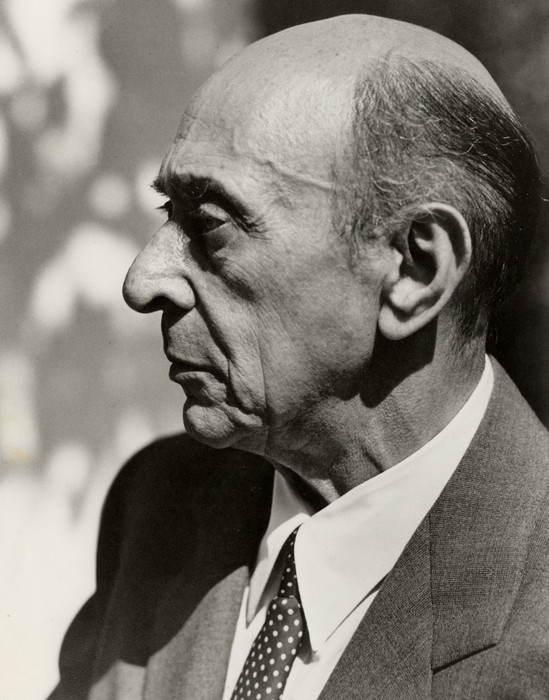
Arnold Schoenberg, 1948

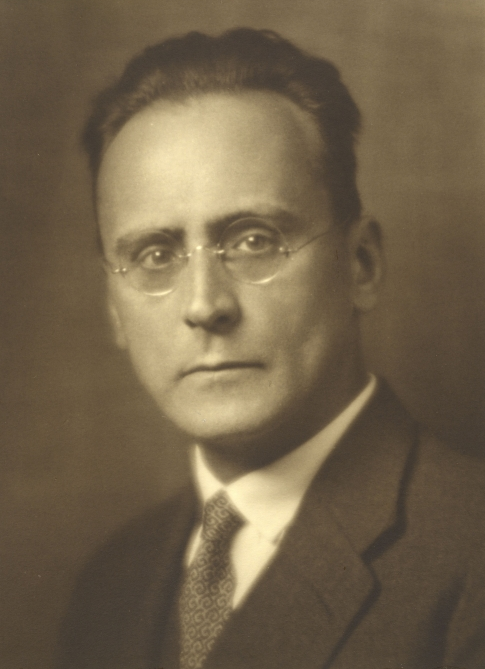
Anton Webern, 1927

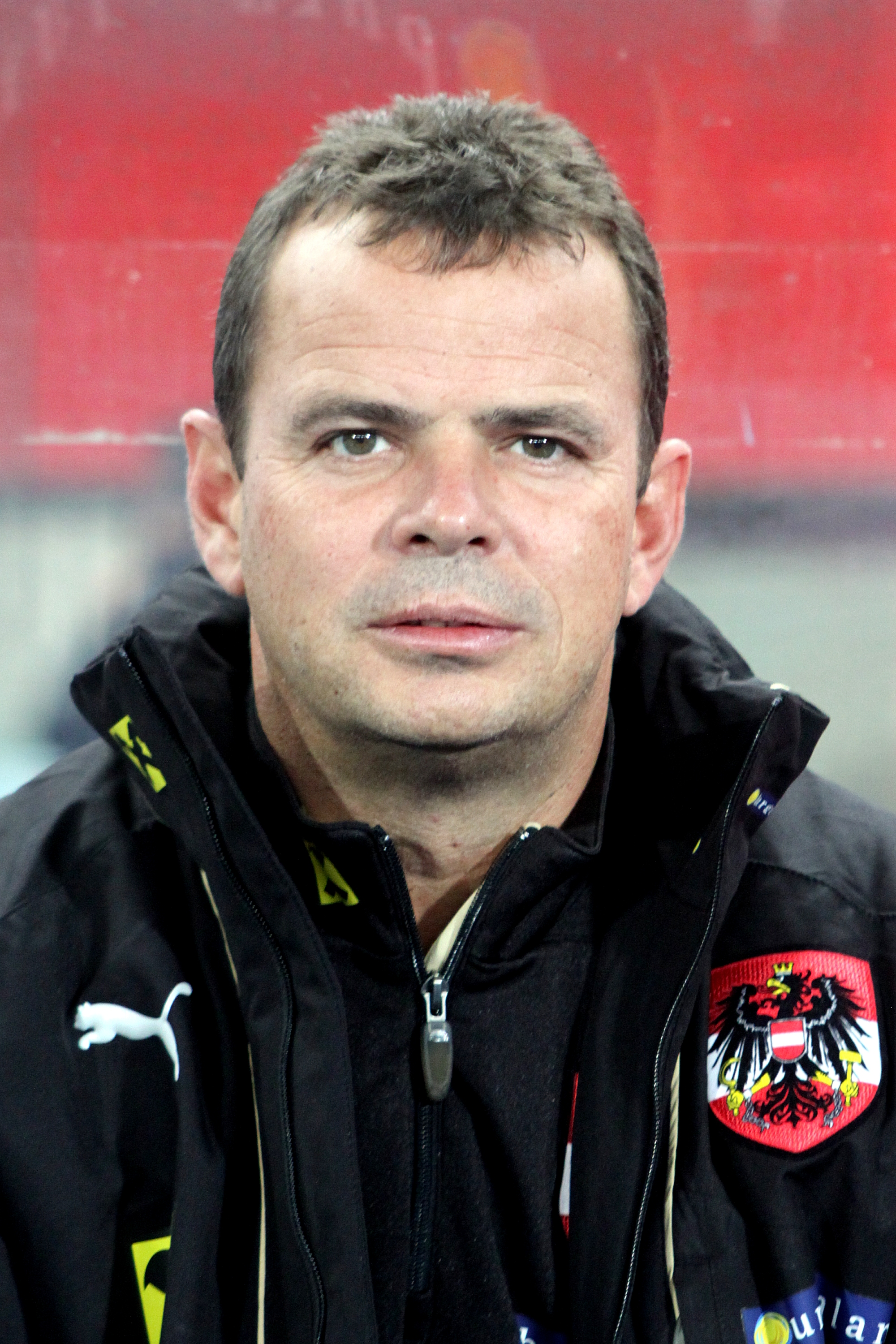
Manfred Zsak, 2009

- Ludwig van Beethoven, (1770-1827), composer, lived here in his later years
- Josef Schöffel, (DE Wiki) (1832-1910), mayor, campaigned for the Vienna Woods in the 1870's
- Maria Janitschek (1859-1927), writer, her works often have strong female characters
- Robert Lamezan de Salins (1869-1930), Polish military officer and diplomat
- Jan Romer, (1869-1934), Polish general, studied here
- Arnold Schoenberg, (1874-1951), painter and composer, lived here
- Robert Müller, (DE Wiki) (1877-1942), film manager, distributor of films and producer
- Anton Wildgans (1881–1932), poet and playwright, nominated for the Nobel Prize in Literature four times
- Anton Webern, (1883-1945), composer and conductor, had a studio in Mödling
- Martin Gusinde, (1886-1969), priest and ethnologist, worked in Tierra del Fuego
- Egon Neumann (1894–1948), composer and Kapellmeister
- Blessed Maria Restituta Kafka, (1894-1943), nun and nurse; worked locally after WW1
- Otto Brunner (1898-1982), historian, worked on later medieval and early modern European social history
- Albert Drach, (1902-1995), writer and lawyer, died locally
- Alfred Maleta, (DE Wiki) (1906-1990) politician (ÖVP), president of the Austrian Parliament
- Ruthilde Boesch (1918–2012), an Austrian soprano in opera, operetta, song and concert; grew up locally.
- Peter Weiser, (DE Wiki) (1926-2012), journalist and secretary general of the Konzerthaus, Vienna
- Franz Koglmann (born 1947), jazz musician on both the trumpet and flugelhorn
- Herbert Kaufmann, (DE Wiki) (born 1949), politician (SPÖ) and on the Management Board of Flughafen Wien AG
- Bruno Liberda (born 1953), composer of contemporary classical music.
- Dieter Chmelar, (DE Wiki) (born 1957), journalist, presenter and comedian
- Michael Spindelegger (born 1959), politician (ÖVP) and Govt. minister
- Manfred Hemm, (born 1961), bass-baritone opera singer
- Gery Keszler (born 1963), founder and organizer of the Life Ball
- Paul Harather, (born 1965), film director, producer and author
- Rupert Huber (born 1967), composer and pianist
- Karin Gayer (born 1969), writer of poetry and narrative fiction.
- Thomas Aigner, (DE Wiki) (born 1973), historian
- Christine Reiler, (DE Wiki) (born 1982), Miss Austria 2007
- Dorothy Khadem-Missagh (born 1992), an Austrian pianist.
- Gerhard W. Weber (born 1961), paleoanthropologist

=== Sport ===
- Manfred Zsak (born 1964), football player, played over 430 games and 49 for Austria
- Ernst Aigner (born 1966), football player, played 419 games and 11 for Austria
- Michael Buchleitner (born 1969), steeplechase and long distance runner
- Stephan Marasek (born 1970), football player, played 273 games and 11 for Austria
- Marion Maruska (born 1972), tennis player
- Andreas Schiener (born 1974), retired football midfielder, played over 320 games.
- Markus Scharrer (born 1974), football player, played 410 games
- Martin Bauer (born 1975), Austrian former motorcycle racer
- Petra Blazek (born 1987), handballer who has played 190 games for Austria women's national handball team
- Stephan Zwierschitz (born 1990), a footballer who has played over 390 games
- Lisa Makas (born 1992), football player, played 74 games for Austria women's national football team
- Raphael Rennhofer (born 2006), racing driver
- AFC Rangers Modling founded in 1986, are the American football club in the city that plays in the top tier of the Austrian Football League. Home games are played at Stadion Mödling.

== International relations ==
=== Twin towns — Sister cities ===
Mödling is twinned with

- Esch-sur-Alzette, Luxembourg
- Velletri, Italy
- Zemun, Serbia
- Offenbach am Main, Germany
- Puteaux, France
- Köszeg, Hungary
- Vsetín, Czech Republic
- Saint-Gilles, Belgium
- Zottegem, Belgium
- Dabas, Hungary

Planned partner city relations:

- Gyál, Hungary
