= 2019 Westmeath County Council election =

Part of the 2019 Irish local elections

← 2014	24 May 2019	2024 →

All 20 seats on Westmeath County Council 11 seats needed for a majority
	First party	Second party	Third party
Party	Fianna Fáil	Fine Gael	Labour
Seats before	8	5	2
Seats won	9	5	2
Seat change	▲1	Steady	Steady
	Fourth party	Fifth party
Party	Green	Independent
Seats before	0	2
Seats won	2	2
Seat change	▲2	Steady
- Results by local electoral area
Council control before election
Fianna Fáil–Fine Gael
Council control after
Fianna Fáil–Green Party

An election to all 20 seats on Westmeath County Council was held on 24 May 2019 as part of the 2019 Irish local elections. County Westmeath was divided into 4 local electoral areas (LEAs) to elect councillors for a five-year term of office on using the electoral system of proportional representation by means of the single transferable vote (PR-STV).

== Boundary review ==
Following the recommendations of the 2018 LEA boundary review committee, the three LEAs used at the 2014 Westmeath County Council election were revised and replaced with four LEAs.

== Results by party ==
Fianna Fáil gained one seat in this election, Fine Gael and the Labour Party retained their five and two seats respectively, the Green Party had its first ever two local councillors in Westmeath elected, Sinn Féin lost their representation on this council while two Independent candidates were elected. The smaller parties that ran candidates in Westmeath (Aontú, the Social Democrats and Renua) failed to make any breakthrough.

Party	Seats	±	1st pref	FPv%	±%
Fianna Fáil	9	▲1	12,259	36.34	▲3.44
Fine Gael	5	Steady	7,860	23.30	▼0.60
Labour	2	Steady	3,469	10.28	▼3.42
Green	2	▲2	1,174	3.48	New
Sinn Féin	0	▼3	1,957	5.80	▼5.30
Aontú	0	Steady	394	1.17	New
Social Democrats	0	Steady	194	0.58	New
Renua	0	Steady	86	0.25	New
Independent	2	Steady	6,344	18.80	▼0.40
Total	20	Steady	33,737	100.00	

== Results by local electoral area ==
*: Outgoing councillor elected in 2014.
†: Outgoing councillor coopted subsequent to the 2014 election.

=== Athlone ===
Athlone: 5 seats
Party	Candidate	FPv%	Count										
Party	Candidate	FPv%	1	2	3	4	5	6	7	8	9	10	11
Fianna Fáil	Frankie Keena	18.55	1,584										
Fianna Fáil	Aengus O'Rourke	15.39	1,314	1,374	1,390	1,403	1,437						
Fine Gael	John Dolan	14.91	1,273	1,298	1,305	1,320	1,335	1,337	1,433				
Independent	Jamie Moran (Note: See change below.)	12.04	1,028	1,042	1,072	1,089	1,126	1,128	1,167	1,238	1,417	1,420	1,615
Green	Louise Heavin	6.95	593	604	627	706	729	731	771	864	935	939	1,071
Fine Gael	Alan Shaw	6.59	563	574	578	594	601	603	623	692	752	754	794
Sinn Féin	Pádraig Hegarty	6.11	522	528	538	558	567	567	581	605	715	716	
Independent	Paul Hogan	5.33	455	464	475	481	503	505	530	581			
Independent	Michael O'Brien	4.03	344	352	363	380	392	394	429				
Independent	P.J. Coghill	3.64	311	318	325	328	347	349					
Aontú	Noel Peter McKervey	2.30	196	198	223	226							
Social Democrats	Fiona Lynam	2.27	194	199	204								
Renua	Anthony Moran	1.01	86	88									
Independent	Imelda Geraghty	0.49	42	42									
Independent	Donal Jackson	0.37	32	33									
Electorate: 19,157 Valid: 8,537 Spoilt: 119 Quota: 1,423 Turnout: 8,656

=== Kinnegad ===
Kinnegad: 5 seats
Party	Candidate	FPv%	Count					
Party	Candidate	FPv%	1	2	3	4	5	6
Fine Gael	Frank McDermott	15.16	1,246	1,281	1,303	1,392		
Fianna Fáil	John Shaw	14.79	1,216	1,244	1,258	1,279	1,322	1,521
Fianna Fáil	Paddy Hill	12.41	1,020	1,021	1,048	1,142	1,303	1,434
Labour	Denis Leonard	12.03	989	1,014	1,020	1,046	1,191	1,314
Fine Gael	Emily Wallace	11.12	914	956	973	993	1,122	1,285
Fianna Fáil	Shauna Coyne	8.41	691	699	710	725	765	
Sinn Féin	Hazel Behan	7.65	629	631	646	749	823	898
Labour	Lorraine Scally	7.08	582	597	608	698		
Independent	Úna D'Arcy	5.99	492	502	569			
Independent	Patrick Joseph Boyhan	3.19	262	268				
Fine Gael	Becky Loftus Dore	2.18	179					
Electorate: 16,746 Valid: 8,220 Spoilt: 169 Quota: 1,371 Turnout: 8,389

=== Moate ===
Moate: 4 seats
Party	Candidate	FPv%	Count			
Party	Candidate	FPv%	1	2	3	4
Fine Gael	Thomas Farrell	18.48	1,567	1,588	1,806	
Fianna Fáil	Liam McDaniel	15.68	1,329	1,363	1,528	1,597
Fianna Fáil	Vinny McCormack	15.49	1,313	1,332	1,358	1,595
Labour	Johnnie Penrose	14.89	1,262	1,342	1,474	1,922
Independent	Michael O'Brien	12.66	1,073	1,199	1,223	1,249
Fianna Fáil	Brian Crum	10.05	852	872	899	
Fine Gael	Damien Clear	7.16	607	644		
Sinn Féin	Peter Judge	3.48	295			
Independent	Searlait Cabdi Ní Chianáin	2.12	180			
Electorate: 15,319 Valid: 8,478 Spoilt: 165 Quota: 1,696 Turnout: 8,643

=== Mullingar ===
Mullingar: 6 seats
Party	Candidate	FPv%	Count									
Party	Candidate	FPv%	1	2	3	4	5	6	7	8	9	10
Independent	Mick Dollard	15.13	1,286									
Fianna Fáil	Ken Glynn	14.02	1,192	1,201	1,203	1,217						
Fianna Fáil	Aoife Davitt	10.42	886	891	892	907	907	921	951	1,008	1,059	1,120
Fianna Fáil	William Patrick Collentine	10.14	862	872	873	886	888	906	930	979	1,029	1,106
Fine Gael	Andrew Joseph Duncan	9.27	788	795	797	811	811	850	880	937	980	1,078
Fine Gael	Gerard Joseph Heery	8.5	723	728	732	741	741	767	786	831	853	955
Green	Hazel Smyth	6.83	581	584	591	605	605	655	681	753	860	1,019
Independent	Sean Lynch	6.25	531	537	545	569	569	611	627	665	742	
Sinn Féin	Sorca Clarke	6.01	511	518	522	537	537	561	587	616		
Labour	Mark Scally	4.16	354	359	360	363	363	384	487			
Labour	Margaret Lynam Sweeney	3.32	282	290	291	295	295	307				
Independent	Chris Murtagh	2.98	253	256	267	294	294					
Aontú	Séamus Burke	2.33	198	200	205							
Independent	Alice McDonnell	0.65	55	56								
Electorate: 19,946 Valid: 8,502 Spoilt: 200 Quota: 1,215 Turnout: 8,702

== Results by gender ==
2019 Westmeath County Council election Candidates by gender
Gender	Number of candidates	% of candidates	Elected councillors	% of councillors
Men	34	69.4%	16	80.0%
Women	15	30.6%	4	20.0%
TOTAL	49		20	

== Changes after 2019 ==
Party	Outgoing	LEA	Reason	Date	Co-optee
Independent	Jamie Moran	Athlone	Resignation	January 2022	Paul Hogan

=== Changes in affiliation ===
Name	LEA	Elected as	New affiliation	Date
Paul Hogan	Athlone	Independent	Independent Ireland	April 2024
