= 2014 Westmeath County Council election =

Part of the 2014 Irish local elections

- 23 May 2014

All 20 seats on Westmeath County Council 11 seats needed for a majority
	First party	Second party	Third party
Party	Fianna Fáil	Fine Gael	Sinn Féin
Seats before	9	8	0
Seats won	8	5	3
Seat change	▼1	▼3	▲3
	Fourth party	Fifth party
Party	Labour	Independent
Seats before	6	0
Seats won	2	2
Seat change	▼4	▲2
- Area of Westmeath County Council

An election to all 20 seats on Westmeath County Council took place on 23 May 2014 as part of the 2014 Irish local elections, a reduction from 23 seats at the 2009 election. The town councils of Athlone and Mullingar were also abolished. County Westmeath was divided into three local electoral areas (LEAs) to elect councillors for a five-year term of office on the electoral system of proportional representation by means of the single transferable vote (PR-STV).

Fianna Fáil emerged as the largest party after the elections as both government parties suffered at the polls. Labour lost two-thirds of their Councillors being reduced to just 2 seats while Fine Gael also lost 3 seats. Sinn Féin won seats on the council for the first time, 3 in total, and were joined by 2 Independents.

== Results by party ==
Party	Seats	±	1st pref	FPv%	±%
Fianna Fáil	8	▼1	11,412	32.9	▼11.03
Fine Gael	5	▼3	8,310	23.9	▼14.85
Sinn Féin	3	▲3	3,837	11.1	▲6.44
Labour	2	▼4	4,766	13.7	▼12.38
Independent	2	▲2	6,391	18.4	▲13.16
Total	20	▼3	34,716	100.0	—

== Results by local electoral area ==
*: Outgoing councillor.

=== Athlone ===
Athlone: 7 seats
Party	Candidate	FPv%	Count								
Party	Candidate	FPv%	1	2	3	4	5	6	7	8	9
Independent	Kevin "Boxer" Moran	21.78	2,897								
Fine Gael	Tom Farrell	11.29	1,502	1,552	1,561	1,594	1,616	1,648	1,649	1,724	
Sinn Féin	Paul Hogan	10.70	1,423	1,684							
Fine Gael	John Dolan	8.16	1,085	1,139	1,146	1,161	1,193	1,239	1,240	1,345	1,681
Fianna Fáil	Aengus O'Rourke	7.88	1,048	1,256	1,267	1,306	1,357	1,387	1,392	1,494	1,636
Fianna Fáil	Frankie Keena	7.77	1,034	1,200	1,213	1,255	1,317	1,373	1,377	1,520	1,648
Fianna Fáil	Vinny McCormack	7.27	967	983	985	991	1,001	1,010	1,010	1,080	1,088
Independent	Michael O'Brien	6.85	911	1,001	1,054	1,084	1,113	1,203	1,208	1,354	1,418
Fine Gael	Alan Shaw	5.43	722	817	829	838	883	899	902	911	
Fianna Fáil	Tom Allen	4.86	647	674	684	716	733	767	769		
Labour	Jim Henson	2.37	315	388	410	428					
Independent	Joe Devery	2.35	313	394	429	476	527				
Independent	P.J. Coghill	2.08	277	312	333						
Independent	John McNamara	0.90	120	171							
Independent	Donal Jackson	0.31	41	68							
Electorate: 22,759 Valid: 13,302 (52.60%) Spoilt: 157 Quota: 1,663 Turnout: 13,459 (53.22%)

=== Mullingar–Coole ===
Mullingar-Coole: 7 seats
Party	Candidate	FPv%	Count							
Party	Candidate	FPv%	1	2	3	4	5	6	7	8
Fianna Fáil	Aidan Davitt	12.90	1,492							
Sinn Féin	Una D'arcy	12.86	1,487							
Fianna Fáil	John Shaw	11.02	1,275	1,287	1,290	1,307	1,331	1,404	1,588	
Fianna Fáil	Paddy Hill	10.44	1,207	1,215	1,220	1,241	1,308	1,326	1,342	1,357
Fine Gael	Frank McDermott	10.06	1,163	1,164	1,167	1,195	1,249	1,372	1,414	1,428
Fine Gael	Peter Burke	8.72	1,008	1,015	1,017	1,031	1,135	1,391	1,534	
Labour	Mick Dollard	8.21	950	956	960	992	1,025	1,062	1,268	1,312
Labour	Denis Leonard	6.24	722	723	724	749	835	895		
Independent	Brian Fagan	5.86	678	684	695	849	888	951	1,057	1,078
Fine Gael	Emily Wallace	5.42	627	630	631	660	731			
Labour	Peter Kearney	4.50	520	521	522	563	563			
Labour	Rachel Grimes	1.47	170	170	172	172				
Independent	Angela Maher	1.23	142	143	146	146				
Independent	Pat Holmes	0.72	83	83	86	86				
Independent	Rosemary Horan	0.36	42	42	44	44				
Electorate: 22,759 Valid: 11,566 (50.82%) Spoilt: 205 Quota: 1,446 Turnout: 11,771 (51.72%)

=== Mullingar-Kilbeggan ===
Mullingar–Kilbeggan: 6 seats
Party	Candidate	FPv%	Count									
Party	Candidate	FPv%	1	2	3	4	5	6	7	8	9	10
Fianna Fáil	Paul Daly	15.25	1,502									
Fianna Fáil	Avril Whitney	12.86	1,266	1,277	1,288	1,295	1,348	1,376	1,405	1,428		
Fianna Fáil	Ken Glynn	9.89	974	992	1,011	1,023	1,058	1,068	1,114	1,133	1,138	1,207
Labour	Johnnie Penrose	9.58	943	952	968	1,029	1,083	1,169	1,369	1,488		
Sinn Féin	Sorca Clarke	9.41	927	932	962	976	987	1,022	1,048	1,073	1,075	1,154
Fine Gael	Andrew Duncan	8.04	792	797	805	827	909	937	999	1,144	1,165	1,432
Fine Gael	Colm Arthur	6.05	596	603	609	637	660	669	696	834	857	
Independent	Brian Fagan	5.93	584	587	733	744	765	793	876	891	903	974
Fine Gael	Michael Newman	4.78	471	487	489	569	622	635	653	653		
Labour	Detty Cornally	4.77	470	471	485	516	535	587	587			
Labour	Gerry Sheridan	3.87	381	382	390	398	401	401				
Fine Gael	Chris Murtagh	3.49	344	344	350	354						
Labour	Ger Corcoran	3.00	295	312	312							
Independent	Chris Burley	1.65	162	163								
Independent	Angela Maher	1.43	141	142								
Electorate: 20,021 Valid: 9,848 (49.19%) Spoilt: 161 Quota: 1,407 Turnout: 10,009 (49.99%)

== Changes ==
=== Co-options ===
Party	Outgoing	LEA	Reason	Date	Co-optee
Independent	Kevin "Boxer" Moran	Athlone	Elected to the 32nd Dáil at the 2016 general election.	21 March 2016	Ailish McManus
Fine Gael	Peter Burke	Mullingar–Coole	Elected to the 32nd Dáil at the 2016 general election.	21 March 2016	Emily Wallace
Fianna Fáil	Paul Daly	Mullingar–Kilbeggan	Elected to 25th Seanad at the 2016 Seanad election.	13 June 2016	Liam McDaniel
Fianna Fáil	Aidan Davitt	Mullingar–Coole	Elected to 25th Seanad at the 2016 Seanad election.	13 June 2016	Bill Collentine
Fianna Fáil	Avril Whitney	Mullingar–Kilbeggan	Resigned for personal reasons.	22 January 2018	Brian Crum

=== Changes in affiliation ===
Name	LEA	Elected as	New affiliation	Date
Paul Hogan	Athlone	Sinn Féin	Independent	2 August 2018
Una D'Arcy	Mullingar–Coole	Sinn Féin	Independent	22 January 2019
