= 2004 Westmeath County Council election =

Part of the 2004 Irish local elections

- 11 June 2004

All 23 seats on Westmeath County Council
	First party	Second party	Third party
Party	Fianna Fáil	Fine Gael	Labour
Seats won	9	8	6
Seat change	▼3	▲2	▲1
- Map showing the area of Westmeath County Council
Council control after election
TBD

An election to Westmeath County Council took place on 11 June 2004 as part of that year's Irish local elections. 23 councillors were elected from five local electoral areas (LEAs) for a five-year term of office on the electoral system of proportional representation by means of the single transferable vote (PR-STV).

== Results by party ==
Party	Seats	±	First Pref. votes	FPv%	±%
Fianna Fáil	9	-3	11,782	34.00	
Fine Gael	8	+2	11,294	32.60	
Labour	6	+1	8,736	25.22	
Sinn Féin	0	0	1,757	5.07	
Green	0	0	381	1.01	
Totals	23	0	34,643	100.00	—

== Results by local electoral area ==
=== Athlone ===
Athlone - 7 seats
Party	Candidate	FPv%	Count								
Party	Candidate	FPv%	1	2	3	4	5	6	7	8	9
Fine Gael	Nicky McFadden*	17.97	1,901								
Fianna Fáil	Kevin "Boxer" Moran*	12.50	1,323								
Fine Gael	Joe Whelan	9.93	1,051	1,108	1,120	1,137	1,162	1,190	1,372		
Fianna Fáil	P.J. Coghill*	8.37	886	908	914	921	950	1,030	1,078	1,086	1,087
Fianna Fáil	Tom Allen*	8.19	867	887	900	916	948	1,014	1,072	1,091	1,093
Fianna Fáil	Kieran Molloy*	7.86	832	889	903	943	1,007	1,159	1,212	1,225	1,227
Fine Gael	Mark Cooney*	7.66	811	1,026	1,052	1,088	1,134	1,228	1,329		
Fianna Fáil	Frankie Keena	7.13	754	810	819	848	894	1,041	1,099	1,108	1,109
Fianna Fáil	Egbert Moran*	6.15	651	688	701	714	738				
Labour	Denis Rohan	4.78	506	534	559	706	804	848			
Sinn Féin	Matt Devlin	4.62	489	508	528	556					
Labour	Jim Henson	3.08	326	372	405						
Green	Martin McEnroe	1.71	184	205							
Electorate: 19,031 Valid: 10,581 (55.60%) Spoilt: 193 Quota: 1,323 Turnout: 10,774 (56.61%)

=== Coole ===
Coole - 3 seats
Party	Candidate	FPv%	Count		
Party	Candidate	FPv%	1	2	3
Fine Gael	Frank McDermott*	30.73	1,355		
Fianna Fáil	Paddy Hill*	22.48	991	1,069	1,128
Fianna Fáil	P.J. O'Shaughnessy*	20.62	909	945	981
Labour	Adrian Murray	19.32	852	973	1,127
Sinn Féin	Niamh Hogg	6.85	302	319	
Electorate: 7,087 Valid: 4,409 (62.21%) Spoilt: 104 Quota: 1,103 Turnout: 4,513 (63.68%)

=== Kilbeggan ===
Kilbeggan - 4 seats
Party	Candidate	FPv%	Count					
Party	Candidate	FPv%	1	2	3	4	5	6
Fine Gael	Joe Flanagan*	28.38	1,683					
Labour	Mark Nugent*	17.30	1,026	1,050	1,131	1,310		
Fianna Fáil	Tom Cowley*	14.47	858	884	915	938	947	1,127
Fine Gael	Michael Newman*	13.66	810	1,016	1,052	1,099	1,127	1,219
Fianna Fáil	Michael Ryan*	8.99	533	671	714	772	797	854
Fianna Fáil	Christo Bradley	6.81	404	414	444	465	475	
Sinn Féin	Eddie Seery	5.50	326	351				
Labour	Pat Boyce	4.89	290	357	405			
Electorate: 9,766 Valid: 1,187 Spoilt: 5,930 (60.72%) Quota: 129 Turnout: 6,059 (62.04%)

=== Mullingar East ===
Mullingar East - 4 seats
Party	Candidate	FPv%	Count						
Party	Candidate	FPv%	1	2	3	4	5	6	7
Labour	Mick Dollard*	28.60	1,809						
Fianna Fáil	Jim Bourke*	13.26	839	905	937	985	1,050	1,106	1,386
Labour	Dan McCarthy*	11.26	744	941	988	1,046	1,071	1,140	1,173
Fine Gael	Patrick McLoughlin*	10.95	693	714	726	741	801	978	1,093
Fianna Fáil	Denis Coyne	7.78	492	506	511	524	628	645	
Labour	Denis Leonard	7.49	474	612	642	678	771	827	922
Fine Gael	Graham Temple	6.20	392	437	465	491	503		
Independent	Robert Bagnall	6.01	380	389	408	441			
Sinn Féin	Johnny Creagh	4.84	306	332	355				
Green	Seán Corrigan	3.11	197	224					
Electorate: 11,089 Valid: 6,326 (57.05%) Spoilt: 147 Quota: 1,266 Turnout: 6,473 (58.37%)

=== Mullingar West ===
Mullingar West - 5 seats
Party	Candidate	FPv%	Count								
Party	Candidate	FPv%	1	2	3	4	5	6	7	8	9
Labour	Johnnie Penrose*	21.25	1,593								
Fine Gael	Fintan Cooney	13.29	996	1,026	1,048	1,090	1,150	1,362			
Fianna Fáil	Ken Glynn*	10.63	797	811	833	888	1,041	1,091	1,152	1,187	1,198
Labour	Detty Cornally	9.10	682	761	798	891	932	1,013	1,437		
Fianna Fáil	Robert Troy	8.62	646	716	781	812	953	987	1,017	1,045	1,061
Fine Gael	Shay Boyhan*	8.35	626	653	676	700	717	823	859	948	1,033
Labour	Betty Doran*	5.79	434	500	523	588	610	647			
Fine Gael	Peter Burke	6.60	495	511	531	571	601				
Fine Gael	Tommy Wright	6.42	481	492	499	533					
Independent	Frank McIntyre	5.51	413	427	476						
Sinn Féin	Declan Gunning	4.46	334	350							
Electorate: 13,184 Valid: 7,497 (56.86%) Spoilt: 124 Quota: 1,250 Turnout: 7,621 (57.80%)
