= 2009 Westmeath County Council election =

Part of the 2009 Irish local elections

- 5 June 2009

All 23 seats on Westmeath County Council
	First party	Second party	Third party
Party	Fianna Fáil	Fine Gael	Labour
Seats before	9	8	6
Seats won	9	8	6
Seat change	Steady	Steady	Steady
- Map showing the area of Westmeath County Council
Council control after election
TBD

An election to Westmeath County Council took place on 5 June 2009 as part of that year's Irish local elections. 23 councillors were elected from five local electoral areas (LEAs) for a five-year term of office on the electoral system of proportional representation by means of the single transferable vote (PR-STV).

== Results by party ==
Party	Seats	±	First Pref. votes	FPv%	±%
Fianna Fáil	9	-	13,777	43.03	
Fine Gael	8	-	12,405	38.75	
Labour	6	-	8,349	26.08	
Independent	0	-	2,036	5.24	
Sinn Féin	0	-	1,494	4.66	
Green	0	-	194	0.50	
Totals	23	-	38,795	100.00	—

== Results by local electoral area ==
=== Athlone ===
Athlone - 6 seats
Party	Candidate	FPv%	Count						
Party	Candidate	FPv%	1	2	3	4	5	6	7
Fianna Fáil	Kevin (Boxer) Moran*	16.82	1,771						
Fianna Fáil	Frankie Keena*	11.23	1,182	1,239	1,299	1,335	1,603		
Fine Gael	Joe Whelan*	10.69	1,125	1,132	1,167	1,225	1,243	1,245	1,505
Fine Gael	Mark Cooney*	10.01	1,054	1,079	1,144	1,259	1,322	1,327	1,542
Fine Gael	Gabrielle McFadden*	8.47	892	927	978	1,113	1,230	1,241	1,405
Fianna Fáil	Tom Allen*	8.38	882	901	943	984	1,111	1,181	1,313
Fine Gael	John Dolan*	8.20	863	877	933	992	1,015	1,017	
Sinn Féin	Paul Hogan	7.94	836	864	915	1,064	1,167	1,175	1,245
Fianna Fáil	Kieran Molloy*	7.28	766	816	832	864			
Labour	Lisa Burke	6.34	667	683	742				
Independent	Jack Moran	4.65	490	505					
Electorate: 19,332 Valid: 10,528 (54.46%) Spoilt: 139 Quota: 1,505 Turnout: 10,667 (55.18%)

=== Coole ===
Coole - 4 seats
Party	Candidate	FPv%	Count		
Party	Candidate	FPv%	1	2	3
Fine Gael	Frank McDermott*	20.31	1,335		
Fianna Fáil	Paddy Hill*	18.68	1,228	1,259	1,345
Labour	Dan McCarthy*	17.37	1,142	1,230	1,353
Fianna Fáil	John Shaw	16.60	1,091	1,133	1,244
Fine Gael	Bernie Comaskey	13.52	889	945	1,089
Independent	Dermot Mullen	7.45	490	594	
Sinn Féin	Mick Kenny	6.07	399		
Electorate: 10,816 Valid: 6,574 (60.78%) Spoilt: 105 Quota: 1,315 Turnout: 6,679 (61.75%)

=== Kilbeggan ===
Kilbeggan - 4 seats
Party	Candidate	FPv%	Count					
Party	Candidate	FPv%	1	2	3	4	5	6
Fine Gael	Joe Flanagan*	24.49	1,768					
Fianna Fáil	Paul Daly*	15.78	1,139	884	915	938	947	1,127
Fine Gael	Colm Arthur	11.95	863	1,016	1,052	1,099	1,127	1,219
Labour	Gerry Corcoran*	11.61	838	1,050	1,131	1,310		
Fine Gael	Michael Newman*	9.57	691	791	821	860	884	
Fianna Fáil	Vinny McCormack	8.23	594	671	714	772	797	854
Fianna Fáil	P.J. Coghill	7.04	508	414	444	465	475	
Fianna Fáil	Vincent Bagnall	6.69	483	414	444	465	475	
Labour	Pat Boyce	4.64	335	357	405			
Electorate: 11,207 Valid: 7,219 (64.42%) Spoilt: 92 Quota: 1,444 Turnout: 7,311 (65.24%)

=== Mullingar East ===
Mullingar East - 4 seats
Party	Candidate	FPv%	Count								
Party	Candidate	FPv%	1	2	3	4	5	6	7	8	9
Labour	Mick Dollard*	31.24	2,032								
Labour	Denis Leonard	13.73	893	1,263	1,275	1,318					
Fine Gael	Peter Burke	13.31	866	946	959	1,004	1,006	1,050	1,156	1,474	
Fianna Fáil	Aidan Davitt	12.28	799	863	868	891	892	975	1,009	1,056	1,111
Fianna Fáil	Jim Bourke*	9.39	611	668	669	695	697	814	872	935	978
Fine Gael	Patrick McLoughlin*	7.30	475	514	519	523	529	573	610		
Fianna Fáil	Georgina Bagnall	4.86	316	335	341	351	353				
Independent	Brian Fagan	3.86	251	299	315	352	356	364			
Green	Seán Corrigan	2.98	194	236	240						
Independent	Frank Harkin	0.74	48	58							
Independent	Errol Farrell	0.29	19	21							
Electorate: 11,197 Valid: 6,504 (58.09%) Spoilt: 98 Quota: 1,301 Turnout: 6,602 (58.96%)

=== Mullingar West ===
Mullingar West - 5 seats
Party	Candidate	FPv%	Count							
Party	Candidate	FPv%	1	2	3	4	5	6	7	8
Labour	Johnnie Penrose*	22.11	1,643							
Fianna Fáil	Robert Troy*	21.36	1,587							
Fine Gael	Fintan Cooney*	11.84	880	925	961	982	1,121	1,156	1,181	1,264
Fianna Fáil	Ken Glynn*	11.04	820	851	984	1,006	1,023	1,048	1,069	1,112
Labour	Detty Cornally*	10.75	799	978	1,017	1,058	1,084	1,151	1,230	1,383
Fine Gael	Chris Murtagh	6.27	466	533	612	624	659	674	706	754
Independent	Betty Doran*	4.41	328	350	366	396	405	462	519	
Sinn Féin	Sorcha Clarke	3.49	259	279	290	311	321	353		
Fine Gael	John Casey	3.20	238	250	260	268				
Independent	Frank McIntyre	3.03	225	245	259	272	279			
Independent	Rashid Butt	2.49	185	193	203					
Electorate: 13,526 Valid: 7,430 (54.93%) Spoilt: 106 Quota: 1,239 Turnout: 7,536 (55.71%)
