= 1999 Westmeath County Council election =

Part of the 1999 Irish local elections

- 10 June 1999

All 23 seats to Westmeath County Council
	First party	Second party	Third party
Party	Fianna Fáil	Fine Gael	Labour
Seats won	12	6	5
Seat change	0	0	+1
	Fourth party
Party	Independent
Seats won	0
Seat change	-1
- Map showing the area of Westmeath County Council
Council control after election
Fianna Fail

An election to Westmeath County Council took place on 10 June 1999 as part of that year's Irish local elections. 23 councillors were elected from five local electoral areas for a five-year term of office on the system of proportional representation by means of the single transferable vote (PR-STV).

== Results by party ==
Party	Seats	±	First Pref. votes	FPv%	±%
Fianna Fáil	12	0	10,519	45.32	
Fine Gael	6	0	5,674	24.44	
Labour	5	+1	6,024	25.95	
Independent	0	-1	996	4.29	
Totals	23	0	23,213	100.00	—

== Results by local electoral area ==
=== Athlone ===
Athlone - 7 seats
Party	Candidate	FPv%	Count								
Party	Candidate	FPv%	1	2	3	4	5	6	7	8	9
Fianna Fáil	P.J. Coghill*	11.06	1,010	1,013	1,070	1,094	1,126	1,219			
Fianna Fáil	Kieran Molloy*	10.86	992	1,022	1,044	1,054	1,080	1,299			
Fine Gael	Brendan McFadden*	10.22	934	952	981	1,039	1,123	1,251			
Fianna Fáil	Tom Allen	9.37	856	863	882	902	963	1,058	1,079	1,092	1,117
Fine Gael	Mark Cooney	9.33	852	873	901	967	1,039	1,103	1,119	1,131	1,141
Fianna Fáil	Egbert Moran*	8.46	773	780	796	843	882	947	1,005	1,032	1,060
Fianna Fáil	Kevin "Boxer" Moran	8.41	768	794	818	839	886	972	1,028	1,057	1,065
Fine Gael	Joe Whelan*	8.41	768	774	791	857	977	986	990	994	996
Fianna Fáil	John Butler	8.24	753	775	791	804	837				
Labour	Denis Rohan	5.99	547	562	590	636					
Fine Gael	Dick O'Brien	4.01	366	374	390						
Independent	Michael Fox	3.04	278	315							
Independent	Benny Cooney	2.62	239								
Electorate: 17,156 Valid: 9,136 (53.25%) Spoilt: 144 Quota: 1,143 Turnout: 9,280 (54.09%)

=== Coole ===
Coole - 3 seats
Party	Candidate	FPv%	Count	
Party	Candidate	FPv%	1	2
Fianna Fáil	Senator Donie Cassidy*	31.33	1,157	
Fianna Fáil	P.J. O'Shaughnessy*	27.73	1,024	
Fine Gael	Frank McDermott*	26.00	960	
Labour	Johnnie Penrose	13.48	498	693
Independent	Peter Rogers	1.46	54	92
Electorate: 6,171 Valid: 3,693 (56.26%) Spoilt: 62 Quota: 924 Turnout: 3,755 (57.08%)

=== Kilbeggan ===
Kilbeggan - 4 seats
Party	Candidate	FPv%	Count
Party	Candidate	FPv%	1
Fianna Fáil	Tom Cowley*	Unopposed	N/A
Fine Gael	Joe Flanagan*	Unopposed	N/A
Labour	Mark Nugent*	Unopposed	N/A
Fianna Fáil	Michael Ryan*	Unopposed	N/A

=== Mullingar East ===
Mullingar East - 4 seats
Party	Candidate	FPv%	Count				
Party	Candidate	FPv%	1	2	3	4	5
Labour	Mick Dollard*	33.11	1,595				
Fianna Fáil	Jim Bourke	14.61	704	788	827	874	1,075
Fine Gael	Patrick McLoughlin	13.62	656	688	709	800	915
Labour	Dan McCarthy	11.73	565	964			
Fianna Fáil	Tommy Wright*	10.05	484	515	554	580	721
Fianna Fáil	Shay Callaghan	9.78	471	492	506	515	
Fine Gael	Pat Whelan	3.84	185	222	237		
Independent	Kevin Whelehan	3.28	158	185			
Electorate: 9,026 Valid: 4,818 (53.38%) Spoilt: 63 Quota: 964 Turnout: 4,881 (54.08%)

=== Mullingar West ===
Mullingar West - 5 seats
Party	Candidate	FPv%	Count							
Party	Candidate	FPv%	1	2	3	4	5	6	7	8
Labour	Willie Penrose TD*	42.05	2,410							
Fianna Fáil	Senator Camillus Glynn*	13.66	783	915	937	984				
Fine Gael	Paul McGrath TD*	11.18	641	834	864	992				
Fianna Fáil	Tom Bourke*	7.61	436	553	575	603	605	611	670	810
Labour	Betty Doran	7.14	409	1,096						
Fianna Fáil	Martin Hynes	5.37	308	378	395	425	431	441	541	600
Fine Gael	Tommy Lyng	4.45	255	320	334					
Independent	Frank McIntyre	4.31	247	339	365	386	391	400		
Fine Gael	John Wallace	4.22	242	340	349	384	407	410	467	
Electorate: 11,119 Valid: 5,731 (51.54%) Spoilt: 78 Quota: 956 Turnout: 5,809 (52.24%)
