= 2024 Westmeath County Council election =

Part of the 2024 Irish local elections

- 7 June 2024

All 20 seats on Westmeath County Council 11 seats needed for a majority
	First party	Second party	Third party
Party	Fianna Fáil	Fine Gael	Labour
Last election	9	5	2
Seats before	9	5	2
Seats won	9	4	2
Seat change	Steady	▼1	Steady
	Fourth party	Fifth party	Sixth party
Party	Sinn Féin	Independent Ireland	Independent
Last election	0	N/A	2
Seats before	0	1	1
Seats won	2	1	2
Seat change	▲2	▲1	Steady
- Area of Westmeath County Council

An election to all 20 seats on Westmeath County Council was held on 7 June 2024 as part of the 2024 Irish local elections. County Westmeath is divided into 4 local electoral areas (LEAs) to elect councillors for a five-year term of office on the electoral system of proportional representation by means of the single transferable vote (PR-STV).

== Results by party ==
Party	Candidates	Seats	±	1st pref	FPv%	±%
Fianna Fáil	10	9	Steady	11,695	31.02	▼5.32
Fine Gael	8	4	▼1	7,420	19.68	▼3.62
Labour	4	2	Steady	3,584	9.51	▼0.77
Sinn Féin	7	2	▲2	3,295	8.74	▲2.94
Independent Ireland	3	1	New	1,575	4.18	New
Green	3	0	▼2	916	2.43	▼1.05
Aontú	1	0	Steady	349	0.93	▼0.24
Irish Freedom	2	0	New	548	1.45	New
Ireland First	2	0	New	482	1.28	New
Social Democrats	1	0	Steady	318	0.84	▲0.26
The Irish People	1	0	New	92	0.24	New
Independent	6	2	Steady	7,426	19.70	▲0.90
Total	48	20	Steady	37,700	100.00	

== Retiring incumbents ==
The following councillors were not seeking re-election:

Constituency	Councillor	Party
Kinnegad	John Shaw	Fianna Fáil
Kinnegad	Paddy Hill	Fianna Fáil
Kinnegad	Frank McDermott	Fine Gael

== Results by local electoral area ==
*: Outgoing councillor elected in 2019.
**: Outgoing councillor elected in 2019 in another LEA.
†: Outgoing councillor coopted subsequent to the 2019 election.
††: Outgoing councillor coopted subsequent to the 2019 election in another LEA

=== Athlone ===
Athlone: 5 Seats
Party	Candidate	FPv%	Count									
Party	Candidate	FPv%	1	2	3	4	5	6	7	8	9	10
Independent	Kevin "Boxer" Moran	39.64%	3,782									
Fianna Fáil	Frankie Keena	14.37%	1,371	1,780								
Fine Gael	John Dolan	12.72%	1,214	1,568	1,639							
Fianna Fáil	Aengus O'Rourke	11.77%	1,123	1,686								
Sinn Féin	Conor Dowling-Linehan	4.66%	445	563	571	579	579	599	628	644		
Green	Louise Heavin	3.82%	364	477	489	508	517	553	629	654	760	
Independent	Tom Cleary	3.31%	316	507	530	546	554	598	642	739	858	1,034
Independent Ireland	Paul Hogan	3.25%	310	530	565	590	601	632	684	814	965	1,120
Irish Freedom	Catrina O'Donohoe	2.91%	278	363	372	377	381	388	399			
Fine Gael	Ruairí Keyes	1.98%	189	260	271	284	296	329				
Labour	Ray Lennon	1.56%	149	216	236	245	249					
Electorate: 20,464 Valid: 9,541 Spoilt: 70 Quota: 1,591 Turnout: 9,661 (47.21%)

=== Kinnegad ===
Kinnegad: 5 Seats
Party	Candidate	FPv%	Count										
Party	Candidate	FPv%	1	2	3	4	5	6	7	8	9	10	11
Labour	Denis Leonard	14.91%	1,457	1,466	1,500	1,502	1,569	1,590	1,632				
Fianna Fáil	Alfie Devine	12.64%	1,236	1,237	1,239	1,239	1,243	1,252	1,279	1,364	1,533	1,689	
Sinn Féin	David Jones	11.61%	1,135	1,137	1,140	1,146	1,203	1,246	1,513	1,553	1,582	1,690	
Fianna Fáil	Niall Gaffney	10.69%	1,045	1,047	1,052	1,052	1,066	1,105	1,114	1,125	1,225	1,263	1,287
Fine Gael	Seamus MacDermott	10.04%	981	981	985	986	1,010	1,028	1,057	1,089	1,101	1,174	1,181
Fine Gael	Emily Wallace	9.73%	951	953	958	960	1,019	1,040	1,061	1,072	1,252	1,408	1,421
Independent Ireland	Brian Crum	6.05%	591	610	613	660	669	732	765	988	1,015		
Fianna Fáil	Shauna Coyne	5.86%	573	573	578	578	600	614	627	635			
Independent	Noleen Fanning	4.38%	428	433	434	464	468	528	548				
Sinn Féin	Maureen Piggot	3.87%	378	380	394	399	468	501					
Aontú	Laura O’Neill	3.57%	349	366	374	390	397						
Fine Gael	Anthonia Izekor	1.79%	175	175	195	196							
Sinn Féin	Frances Monahan	1.53%	150	155	161	161							
Green	Carol Okeke	1.24%	121	122									
Ireland First	Sarah Heraty	1.16%	113	131	133								
The Irish People	Ian McGauley	0.94%	92										
Electorate: 18,090 Valid: 9,775 Spoilt: 123 Quota: 1,630 Turnout: 9,898 (54.72%)

=== Moate ===
Moate: 4 Seats
Party	Candidate	FPv%	Count				
Party	Candidate	FPv%	1	2	3	4	5
Fine Gael	Tom Farrell	23.96%	2,185				
Fianna Fáil	Vinny McCormack	17.87%	1,630	1,777	1,797	1,833	
Fianna Fáil	Liam McDaniel	16.23%	1,480	1,512	1,522	1,558	1,826
Labour	Johnnie Penrose	15.80%	1,441	1,516	1,537	1,663	1,851
Independent	Michael O’Brien	11.24%	1,025	1,093	1,174	1,253	1,465
Independent Ireland	Paul Hogan	7.39%	674	697	779	873	
Sinn Féin	John Lawlor	4.56%	416	424	445		
Irish Freedom	Shane Lynam	2.96%	270	277			
Electorate: 16,297 Valid: 9,121 Spoilt: 72 Quota: 1,825 Turnout: 9,193 (56.41%)

=== Mullingar ===
Mullingar: 6 Seats
Party	Candidate	FPv%	Count								
Party	Candidate	FPv%	1	2	3	4	5	6	7	8	9
Independent	Mick Dollard	18.31%	1,696								
Fianna Fáil	Ken Glynn	14.27%	1,322	1,387							
Fianna Fáil	Aoife Davitt	10.54%	976	1,009	1,017	1,023	1,029	1,048	1,060	1,133	1,258
Fine Gael	Andrew Duncan	10.43%	966	1,001	1,010	1,014	1,018	1,029	1,056	1,119	1,266
Fianna Fáil	Bill Collentine	10.14%	939	981	995	1,002	1,006	1,017	1,029	1,076	1,222
Fine Gael	Gerry Heery	8.19%	759	784	788	796	797	821	840	913	1,048
Sinn Féin	Julie McCourt	6.18%	572	607	611	753	769	830	886	942	1,053
Labour	Fidelma Bennett	5.80%	537	580	588	595	602	658	695	877	
Green	Hazel Smyth	4.65%	431	442	444	446	452	560	577		
Ireland First	Margaret Maguire	3.98%	369	392	392	396	514	537			
Social Democrats	Ali Morris	3.43%	318	325	326	335	347				
Sinn Féin	Damien Rooney	2.15%	199	209	210						
Independent	Patrick Hussey	1.93%	179	222	226	229					
Electorate: 20,673 Valid: 9,263 Spoilt: 133 Quota: 1,324 Turnout: 9,396 (45.45%)
