= Mullingar Courthouse =

Building in County Westmeath, Ireland

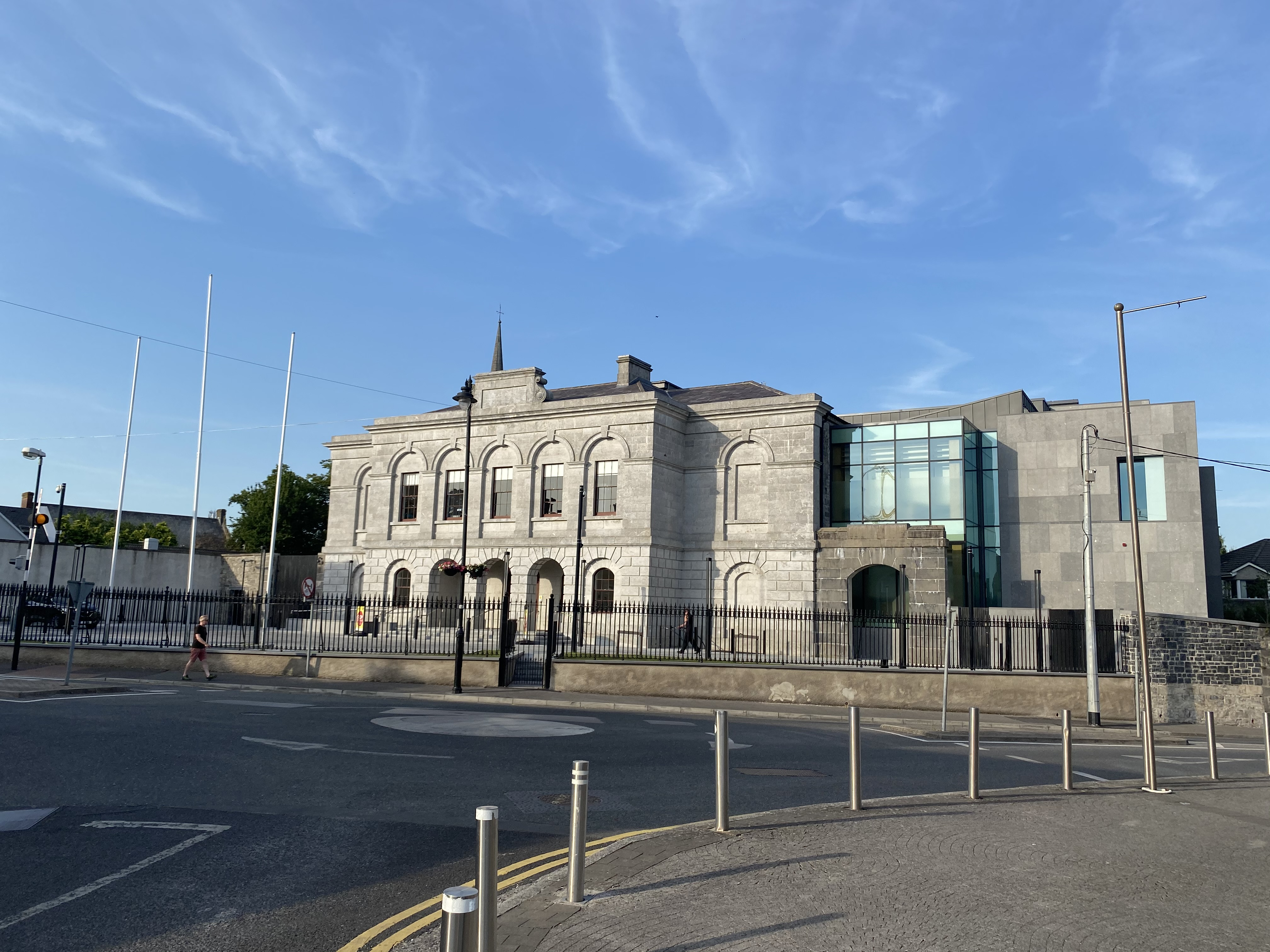
- Mullingar Courthouse, 2021

- Location within Ireland

General information
- Architectural style: Neoclassical style
- Location: Mullingar, County Westmeath, Ireland
- Coordinates: 53.5243°N 7.3402°W
- Completed: 1828

Design and construction
- Architect: John Hargrave

Mullingar Courthouse is a judicial facility in Mullingar, County Westmeath, Ireland.

== History ==
The courthouse, which was designed by John Hargrave in the neoclassical style and built in ashlar stone, was completed in 1828. The design involved a symmetrical main frontage with seven bays facing Mount Street; the central section of five bays, which slightly projected forward, was arcaded on the ground floor and there were sash windows with segmental surrounds flanked by pilasters supporting an entablature on the first floor. At roof level, the central bay contained a raised panel which was flanked by volutes.

The building was primarily used as a facility for dispensing justice but, following the implementation of the Local Government (Ireland) Act 1898, which established county councils in every county, the Grand Jury Room also became the meeting place for Westmeath County Council. The county Council moved to County Hall on the opposite side of Mount Street in 1913. After being extensively refurbished and extended, it was re-opened by Frank Clarke, Chief Justice of Ireland, with Minister for Justice Charlie Flanagan in 2018.
