= Foster and Allen =

Country & Irish musical double act

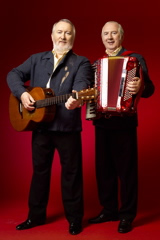

Background information
- Origin: Ireland
- Genres: Trad. Irish, folk, MOR, country, Country and Irish
- Years active: 1975–present
- Labels: CMR, Ritz, Stylus, Telstar, DMG TV
- Members: Mick Foster; Tony Allen
- Website: fosterandallen.ie

Foster and Allen are a musical duo from Ireland consisting of Mick Foster and Tony Allen. In their 50 year career, they have released over 52 albums, many of which entered the UK Albums Chart. Along with "A Bunch of Thyme" (entering the Irish chart in 1979 and becoming their first No. 1 single), "Maggie" became a No. 1 in New Zealand for four weeks, making the two songs their signature tunes. They started in the 1970s as a duo, but in 1982 they added a band to their show. They have achieved album and video sales in excess of 25 million worldwide. As well as the albums, they have released thirteen videos/DVDs, again all of which have entered the British charts. The video ‘Souvenirs and Memories’ reached No. 3 in the charts around Christmas 1991, the “By Request” video went straight into the No. 1 spot in 1993.“Around the World with Foster & Allen” was a Top 10 Chart Release in the U.K. Foster and Allen have toured Ireland, the UK, the US, Canada, South Africa, Australia and New Zealand. They have also had their own TV series on television in Ireland.

== History ==
Foster and Allen began in 1975 when they were playing in country music bands around Ireland. Soon after they formed a small group and went over to the UK to work the Irish music venues on a short tour. At this stage they had the idea of working together as a duo, playing easy listening music with traditional Irish instrumentals.

When their UK tour finished, they decided to let the band return to Ireland whilst they stayed behind to try to break into the public eye. They played several venues in the London area and the reaction was favourable; they decided to remain as a duo, and Foster and Allen was formed. After a time working around the circuit in the UK and Ireland, they released their first single, "The Rambles of Spring". This made an impact on the Irish market and Foster and Allen were soon in demand for cabaret venues all over Ireland.

At the end of 1979, Foster and Allen released the single, "A Bunch of Thyme" in Ireland, and it entered the Irish chart. Despite the romance and charm of the music and lyrics the song is in reality a warning to young women to protect their virginity. The girl in the song loses her virginity to a "lusty sailor who chanced to pass her way, he stole her bunch of thyme away". It became their first number one single, and stayed on the chart for 40 weeks. It was not until 1982 that this single was released in the UK. It was played by all the radio stations in Britain, and peaked at No. 18 in the UK Singles Chart. At the time, Foster and Allen were in the United States on a tour. They were contacted and told to fly back to the UK to appear on BBC Television's Top of the Pops.

Demand for Foster and Allen's services at venues all over Ireland and the UK increased. They released another single, "Old Flames", which peaked at No. 51 in the UK chart. They undertook their first concert tour of the UK in 1983, and this tour was boosted by the release of another single "Maggie". This reached No.27 in the UK Singles Chart and became a No.1 in New Zealand for four weeks.

Foster and Allen have toured Ireland, the UK, the US, Canada, South Africa, Australia and New Zealand. They have also had their own TV series on RTÉ Television in Ireland.

In the early days, Mick Foster and Tony Allen performed on stage as a duo, but in 1982 (when the concert tours started) they added a band to their show, thus giving a much fuller sound to their program. On the recording front, Foster and Allen have released over 52 albums, many of which entered the UK Albums Chart. As well as the albums, they have released thirteen videos. The video "Souvenirs and Memories" reached No. 3 in the UK video chart around Christmas 1991, the "By Request" video went straight into the No. 1 spot in 1993. Their DVD/video release After All These Years became Top 10 in the UK. To date, Foster and Allen have achieved album and video sales in excess of 25 million worldwide.

Foster and Allen celebrated their 30th Anniversary together in the music industry with the release of their album, Foster and Allen Sing the No. 1's, which was a Top 30 hit in the UK Albums Chart during Christmas 2005. Their "World Concert Tour – 2005/2006" took them to the United Kingdom, Canada, South Africa, Ireland, US and Australia.

== Mick Foster ==
Foster was born in 1947 in County Kildare, in sight of the Curragh. He now lives in Mullingar, and has a small farm where he spends all his time, when not touring, looking after his horses. He has one son (Jackie) & three daughters (Denise and twins Sandra & Louise).

Foster was taught to play the accordion by a Sr Anges Murray, a nun of the Mercy Order in Ballymahon and Frankie Gavigan. Other influences on his playing included Jimmy Shand and Will Starr. He has recorded a tribute to the latter, entitled The Old Button Box, and has claimed that his accordion would probably be the last thing he would be prepared to give up

== Tony Allen ==
Allen was born on 24 February 1952 in Mount Temple, County Westmeath, the youngest of a family of nine children. He was keen on music from an early age, and was encouraged by his parents and teachers. His father, Patrick, was a fiddle player while his mother was a singer. Allen started playing the accordion after one of his brothers brought him an accordion home from England. It was not long before he joined the Mary Landers, (a local band), and subsequently, the Kieran Kelly Band, replacing Brendan Shine.

In 1973, along with his brother Tom (T.R. Dallas), Allen was part of Doc Carroll's Nightrunners Showband. It was another Athlone man, Kevin Sheerin, who recommended Allen for the job in this band. They used to play mostly around the Midlands and a residency in the Irish Club, Parnell Square, Dublin, every Tuesday night.

Allen opened a recording studio in Moate, Roseland Studios, and most major acts in Ireland record their albums there. He is motivated by music; having the studio, he is now directing his interests into the technical side of the business. He has two boys, Ian and Keith.

== Discography ==
=== Albums ===
Year	Title	Peak chart positions				Certifications
Year	Title	IRE	UK	AUS	NZ	Certifications
1976	The Blacksmith	—	—	—	—	
1980	A Bunch of Thyme	—	—	—	—	BPI: Silver
1982	The Foster and Allen Selection	—	—	—	—	
1983	Maggie	—	72	22	1	BPI: Silver
1983	I Will Love You All My Life	—	71	4	3	
1984	The Foster and Allen Selection	—	—	56	—	
1984	The Very Best of Foster and Allen	—	18	43	—	BPI: Gold
1986	After All These Years	—	82	—	2	
1986	Reminiscing with Foster and Allen	—	11	24	—	BPI: Platinum
1987	Love Songs – The Very Best of Foster and Allen Volume 2	—	92	—	—	
1987	Reflections	—	16	18	25	BPI: Platinum
1988	Remember You're Mine	—	16	11	40	BPI: Gold
1988	The Worlds of Foster and Allen	—	16	84	—	BPI: Gold
1989	The Magic of Foster and Allen	—	29	13	11	BPI: Gold
1989	Christmas Collection	—	40	—	19	BPI: Gold
1990	Souvenirs	—	15	56	—	BPI: Gold
1990	The Christmas Collection	—	44	—	—	
1991	Memories	—	18	34	10	BPI: Gold
1992	Heart Strings	—	37	96	—	
1993	By Request	—	14	10	48	BPI: Gold; ARIA: Gold
1994	Songs We Love to Sing	—	41	59	—	BPI: Silver
1995	100 Golden Greats	—	39	12	—	BPI: Gold; ARIA: Gold
1996	Foster and Allen's Ireland	—	—	—	—	
1996	Something Special – 100 Golden Love Songs	—	46	14	14	BPI: Silver; ARIA: Gold (DVD)
1997	Shades of Green	—	55	59	—	
1997	Best Friends	—	36	30	25	BPI: Gold
1998	Greatest Hits	—	52	29	19	BPI: Silver
1999	One Day at a Time	—	61	30	9	
2000	The Love Collection	—	—	96	—	
2001	Partners in Rhyme	—	—	29	45	
2002	Sincerely	—	30	35	9	
2003	By Special Request – The Very Best of Foster and Allen	65	30	—	—	BPI: Gold
2004	Sing the Sixties	—	31	—	—	BPI: Gold
2005	Sing the Number Ones	—	30	—	38	BPI: Gold
2006	At the Movies	—	48	—	—	
2006	The Great Foster & Allen	—	—	—	—	ARIA: Gold
2007	Songs of Love and Laughter	94	50	—	—	BPI: Silver
2008	The Country Collection	—	—	—	—	
2009	Sing the Million Sellers	—	34	—	24	BPI: Silver
2009	Love Love Love: 36 Classic Hits for the One You Love	—	—	67	5	
2010	Magic Moments	—	40	—	—	
2012	The Ultimate Collection	76	38	—	—	BPI: Silver
2017	The Gold Collection	—	34	—	—	
2018	Putting On the Style	96	29	—	—	
"—" denotes a recording that did not chart or was not released in that territory.

=== Singles ===
Year	Title	Peak chart positions			
Year	Title	IRE	AUS	UK	NZ
1976	"The Rambles of Spring"	—	—	—	—
1979	"A Bunch of Thyme"	1	—	—	—
1982	"A Bunch of Thyme" (re-issue)	8	—	18	—
1982	"Old Flames"	3	—	51	—
1983	"Maggie"	6	17	27	1
1983	"Sweethearts in the Spring"	13	—	—	—
1983	"I Will Love You All My Life"	17	45	49	—
1984	"Just for Old Time's Sake"	22	—	47	—
1984	"We Will Make Love"	25	—	—	—
1985	"After All These Years"	11	—	43	—
1986	"Nobody's Darlin' But Mine"	10	—	—	—
1986	"When I Dream"	—	—	—	—
1987	"True Love" (with Gloria Hunniford)	—	—	—	—
1987	"When My Blue Moon Turns to Gold Again"	—	—	—	—
1987	"Part of Me"	16	—	—	—
1987	"The Black Sheep"	11	—	—	—
1988	"Golden Years"	16	—	—	—
1989	"I'll Never Stop Wanting You"	22	—	—	—
2003	"The Fields of Athenry"	19	—	—	—
2013	"Galway Girl"/"One Little Christmas Tree" (featuring Shayne Ward)	—	—	—	—
"—" denotes a recording that did not chart or was not released in that territory.
