= It's Hard to Be Humble =

"It's Hard to be Humble"

Single by Mac Davis

from the album Hard To Be Humble
- B-side: "The Greatest Gift of All"
- Released: March 1980
- Genre: Country
- Length: 4:20
- Label: Casablanca
- Songwriter: Mac Davis
- Producer: Larry Butler

Mac Davis singles chronology
| "Every Now and Then" (1976) | "It's Hard to be Humble" (1980) | "Let's Keep It That Way" (1980) |

45 RPM side label
- US release

"It's Hard to be Humble" is a song written and recorded by American country music artist Mac Davis from his LP, Hard To Be Humble. It became an international hit in the spring of 1980.

A version by T.R. Dallas became a Top 10 hit in Ireland during the fall of the year. The song was covered by Rolf Harris in 1980 and Willie Nelson in 2019. The song was additionally covered in Dutch in 1981 by Peter Blanker under the name of "'t Is moeilijk bescheiden te blijven", which became a top 10 hit in the Netherlands, and in German (by Peter Petrel) under the title "Ich bin viel zu bescheiden". In 2022, the Slovenian folk band Fehtarji covered it in Slovene under the title "Gospod, težko sem ponižen".

== Chart history ==
=== Weekly charts ===
| Chart (1980) | Peak position |
|---|---|
| Australia (Kent Music Report) | 9 |
| Canada RPM Top Singles | 14 |
| Canada RPM Country | 4 |
| New Zealand | 3 |
| UK Singles Chart | 27 |
| U.S. Billboard Hot 100 | 43 |
| U.S. Billboard Country | 10 |
| U.S. Cash Box Top 100 | 35 |

| Chart (1981) | Peak position |
|---|---|
| South Africa (Springbok) | 8 |

T.R. Dallas cover

| Chart (1980) | Peak position |
|---|---|
| Ireland (IRMA) | 6 |

=== Year-end charts ===
| Chart (1980) | Rank |
|---|---|
| Australia (Kent Music Report) | 28 |
| Canada | 87 |
| New Zealand | 14 |
| U.S. (Joel Whitburn's Pop Annual) | 247 |

== Certifications ==
| Region | Certification | Certified units/sales |
|---|---|---|
| Australia (ARIA) | Platinum | 100,000^{^} |
| Canada (Music Canada) | Gold | 75,000^{^} |
| New Zealand (RMNZ) | Gold | 10,000^{*} |
^{*} Sales figures based on certification alone.^{^} Shipments figures based on certification alone.
