= Michael Gibbs (priest) =

Anglican clergyman (1900–1962)

Michael McCausland Gibbs (1 September 1900 – 27 July 1962) was an eminent Anglican clergyman in the third quarter of the 20th century.

Gibbs was the son of Rev. Reginald Gibbs, Vicar of Clifton Hampden, and his wife, Laura McCausland of Drenagh. He was educated at Lancing and Keble College, Oxford. His grandfather, Rev. John Lomax Gibbs, was a younger brother of Hucks Gibbs, 1st Baron Aldenham.

Gibbs was ordained in 1926 and began as curate at St. Mary's Church, Putney. He moved to Rhodesia where he was Chaplain to Edward Paget, Bishop of Southern Rhodesia, then Rector of Bulawayo and finally the Archdeacon of Matabeleland.

Moving to South Africa, he was then Rector of St Saviour, Claremont, Cape Town, and after that Dean of Cape Town. He returned to England in 1954 and was Dean of Chester until his death.

== Family ==
Gibbs married Edith Marjorie Ward, daughter of Mr and Mrs John Ward of Long Wittenham, in 1926. They had five children.
