= John Hargrave (architect) =

Irish architect

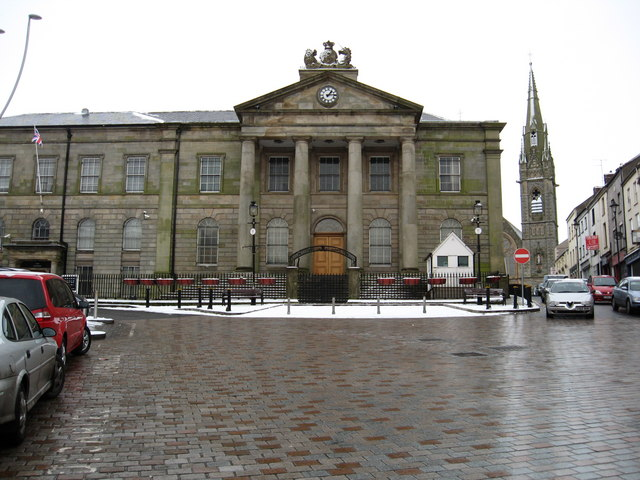
Omagh Courthouse, County Tyrone, was completed in 1814

John Hargrave (c. 1788−1833) was an Irish architect who was active mainly in Ireland in the early 19th century. Born in Cork c. 1788, Hargrave was the third son of architect Abraham Addison Hargrave (1755−1808).

John Hargrave was responsible for the design of a number of manor houses in Ireland, including Castle Forbes (c. 1819), Doory Hall (c. 1820), Drenagh (c. 1825), and Favour Royal (1825). A number of churches, gaols and courthouses are also attributed to him, including Omagh Courthouse (1814) and Mullingar Courthouse (1828). His architectural practice had an office on Talbot Street in Dublin.

Several other members of Hargave's family were also involved in architecture and construction, including his brother Abraham Addison Hargrave (d.1838).

John Hargrave died, along with his wife and children, in a yachting accident in Cardigan Bay on 30 August 1833.
