= County Buildings, Mullingar =

Municipal building in County Westmeath, Ireland

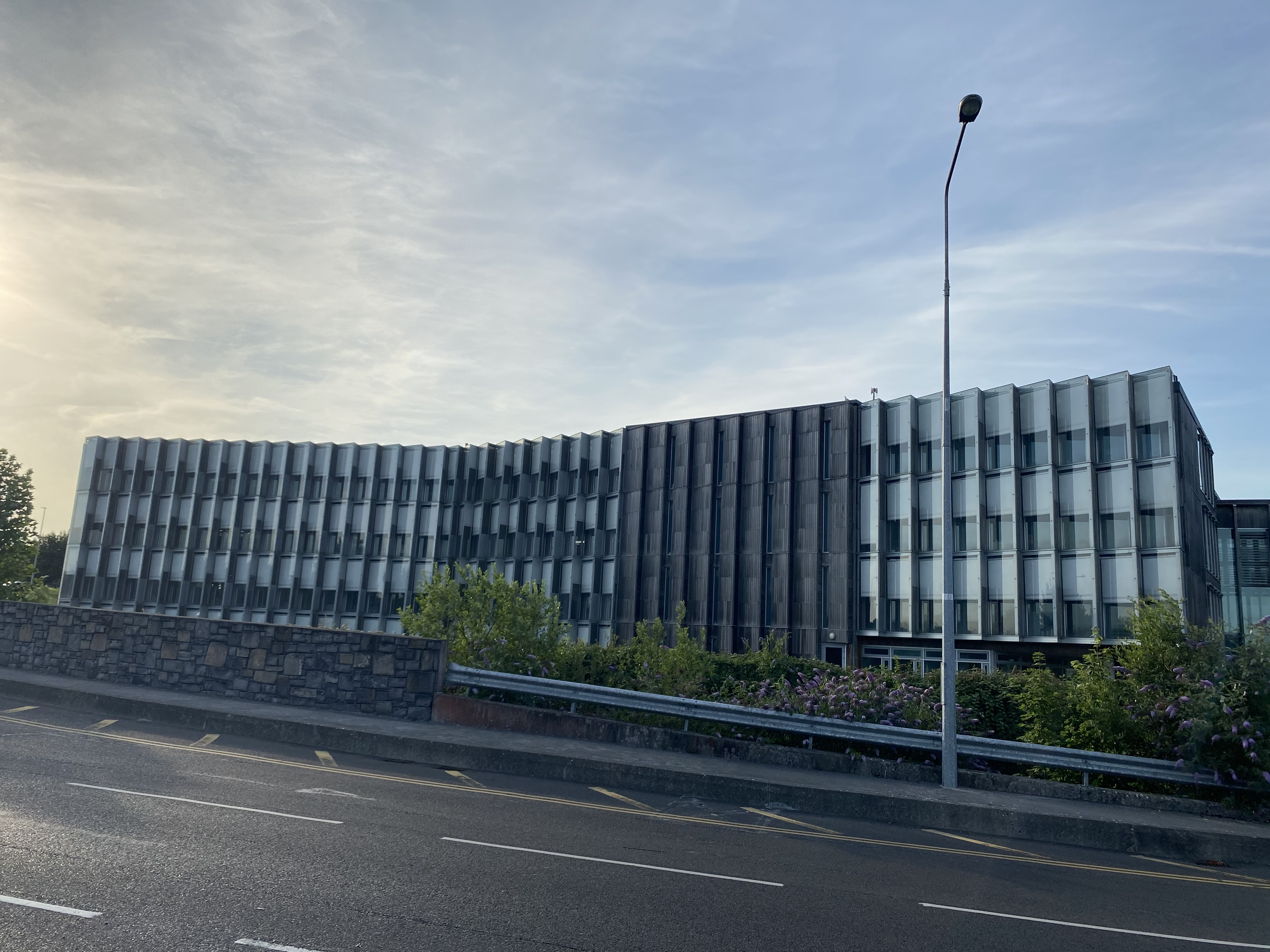
- County Buildings in July 2021

- Location within Ireland

General information
- Architectural style: Modern style
- Location: Mullingar, County Westmeath, Ireland
- Coordinates: 53.5232°N 7.3408°W
- Completed: 2009

Design and construction
- Architect: Bucholz McEvoy

County Buildings is a municipal facility in Mullingar, County Westmeath, Ireland.

== History ==
In the early part of the 21st century, Westmeath County Council held its meetings in the old County Hall (now the Mullingar Arts Centre) in Mount Street. It moved to more modern facilities at the new County Buildings, designed by Bucholz McEvoy, to the south of the old facilities in Mullingar in 2009. The new building won the 2009 Opus Architecture and Construction Award and received a commendation in the 2010 Royal Institute of the Architects of Ireland Awards.
