= Drenagh =

House in County Londonderry, Northern Ireland

Coordinates: 55°03′19″N 6°55′20″W

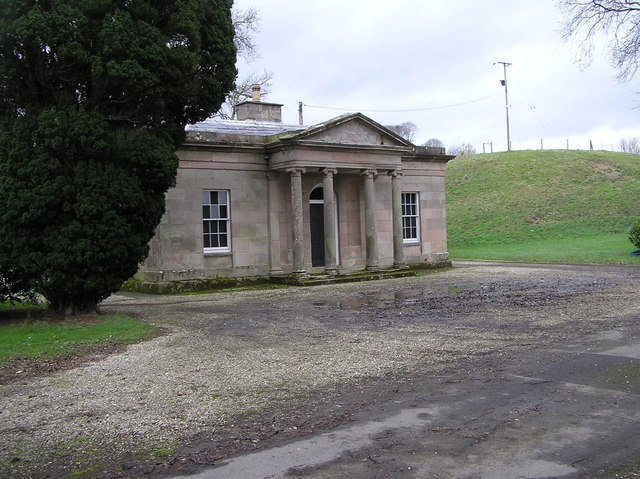
The West Gate to the Drenagh Estate, designed by Charles Lanyon

Drenagh is a 19th-century house and gardens in Limavady, County Londonderry, Northern Ireland. Drenagh has been the home of the McCausland family since 1729, and the present house was built in 1835 (191 years ago). It was the first major work by Charles Lanyon, known for his work in Belfast. The gardens include features from the 18th century, as well as an extensive 19th-century Italian garden and elements added in the 1960s. The house is a Grade A listed building.

== History ==
The Drenagh estate, then known as Fruithill, was acquired from the Bishopric of Derry by William Conolly (1662–1729), a wealthy self-made man and speaker of the Irish Parliament. By his will he left his interest in the property to his agent Robert McCausland “as an acknowledgment for the faithful service he has done me”, and the bequest allowed the McCauslands to establish themselves as county gentry. McCausland was the grandson of Baron Alexander McAuslane who had settled in the Strabane area in the 1540s, and he named his first son (by his wife Hannah, née Moore) Conolly McCausland for his employer. In the 1730s Robert McCausland built the first house at Fruithill, located to the south-east of the present building, and in the 1790s this house was extended. Nothing remains of this house, though a walled garden remains from this period as well as elements of the demesne landscape.

Conolly McCausland married the heiress Elizabeth Gage and had a son, also Conolly McCausland, who married Theodosia Mahon from Strokestown, County Roscommon. This second Conolly McCausland approached architect John Hargrave to design a new house, but only the gate lodge was built prior to the deaths of McCausland and Hargrave. In 1836, their son, Marcus McCausland (1787–1862), commissioned Sir Charles Lanyon to build the present house. Marcus and his wife, Marianne (née Tyndall) produced an heir, Conolly Thomas McCausland (1828–1902).

Conolly Thomas McCausland was High Sheriff of County Londonderry in 1866. He married Laura St John, daughter of the 15th Baron St John of Bletso. Their son, Maurice Marcus McCausland (1872–1938), lived through the Irish Land Acts, whereby the Government compulsorily purchased 75% of the estate. Their daughter, Laura, married Reginald Gibbs and was the mother of Michael McCausland Gibbs (1900–1962), an eminent Anglican clergyman.

Maurice's son, Conolly Robert McCausland (1906–1968) fought in the Second World War and was reportedly so deeply moved by what he had witnessed that he was received into the Roman Catholic faith, despite knowing he had signed a codicil to his father's will barring him from inheriting should he become a Catholic. The will was contested and was found valid, although the codicil applied only to Conolly Robert, not to any of his direct descendants. So, upon the death of Conolly Robert McCausland in 1968, his son Marcus Edgcumbe McCausland (1933–1972) inherited Drenagh. On 4 March 1972, this same Captain Marcus McCausland, aged 39, a retired Catholic member of the Ulster Defence Regiment, became the first UDR soldier murdered by the Official Irish Republican Army (OIRA). He was shot dead by the Braehead Road in Derry. In 2014, the McCausland family were forced to place Drenagh on the market, but following the partial sale of the estate the family were able to retain ownership of Drenagh.

On 5 May 1943 a Royal Air Force Vickers Wellington (LB241) crashed on the estate grounds shortly after taking off from RAF Limavady; all six crew died.

== Gardens ==
The wooded demesne dates from the 18th century and is partly walled. There are terraced gardens in the Italian style, an arboretum, and a fountain inspired by one at the Villa d'Este, near Rome. The Moon Garden and Orbit Garden date from the 1960s and show Chinese and Arts & Crafts influences. The site is included on the Register of Parks, Gardens and Demesnes of Special Historic Interest.
