= T.R. Dallas =

Singer and politician in Ireland

Tom Allen
- Also known as: T.R. Dallas
- Born: 21 October 1949 (age 75); Mount Temple, Moate, Westmeath, Ireland
- Genres: Country
- Occupation(s): Singer, politician
- Instrument: Vocals
- Years active: 1970–present
- Website: www.trdallas.net

Tom Allen (born 21 October 1949), known professionally as T.R. Dallas, is a country and Irish singer and former Fianna Fáil party member of Westmeath County Council in Ireland.

Born in Mount Temple, County Westmeath, Tom Allen is the brother of Tony Allen of the folk music duo Foster and Allen. Tom worked in motor maintenance and sales, and started his showband singing career in 1970 with the Finnavons Showband, previously fronted by Gerry Black. A few years later he joined the Sailors Showband, and got his break in 1978 replacing John Glenn in The Mainliners, the backing band for Big Tom. In June 1980, Allen exploited the hype around the Dallas soap opera's "Who shot J.R.?" summer cliffhanger by adopting the name "T.R. Dallas" to release the novelty record "Who Shot J.R. Ewing?" which reached number 10 in the Irish Singles Chart. Later that year his cover version of Mac Davis' "It's Hard to Be Humble" reached number six in the Irish charts. He continued to tour Ireland and the UK in the 1980s and 1990s, releasing further singles and an album. His career was interrupted in 1990 after he was diagnosed with diabetes.

As Tom Allen he was a Fianna Fáil member of Westmeath Council for the local electoral area of Athlone from the 1999 local elections until defeated in the 2014 election. He continued to perform as T.R. Dallas, often at charity fundraising events.

== Discography ==
Tom Allen / T.R. Dallas discography
Title	B-Side	Catalogue	Release date	Irish Charts	Notes
"Ghost Story"	"I Wouldn't Want to Live If You Didn't Love Me" / "I Recall a Gypsy Woman"	RL.828	Jan 1976		With the Sailors
"The Family That Prays"			May 1978		With the Mainliners
"You Are My Sunshine"			Dec 1978		With the Mainliners
"Who Shot J.R. Ewing"	"Mrs. Jones"	CM 007	June 1980	10	
"It's Hard to be Humble"	Selection of Reels	CM 011	Sep 1980	6	
"Kisses on the Door"		CM 028	Early 1981		
"Daddy's Girl"	"A Pub with No Beer"	CM 027	Dec 1981	26	
"It'll Come Back"		CM 031			
"Big Tom Doesn't Play Here Anymore"	"Faded Picture"	CM 034			
"I'm Gonna Hire a Wino (to Decorate Our Home)"		CM 040			
Everybody's Makin' It Big But Me	—	CMLP 1008	1982		Album
"Diet Song"	"Candlelight And Wine"	CM 044 J	1983		
"The Rose of Mooncoin"		CM 061			
"I Don't Work for a Living"	"I Got To Get Rid Of This Band"	CM 063	1986		
"21 Acres of Land"			Dec 1987	22	Chart Records release
"The Story I Tell You Is True"					
"Rambling Boy"					
"Be My Guest"					
