= Doory Hall =

Historic building in Ireland

Coordinates: 53.5981°N 7.7395°W

Doory Hall is an estate and now-ruined historic building in County Longford, Ireland. While some parts of the estate (including a number of its outbuildings) are included on Longford County Council's Record of Protected Structures, the 19th century manor house itself is now a largely empty "shell".

The estate was the home of the Jessop family, for whom the house was extensively remodeled by the architect John Hargrave c. 1820. Doory Hall was the birthplace of the playwright George H. Jessop (1852–1915).
