= Nessa Robins =

Irish food writer

- Born: County Westmeath, Ireland
- Education: Trinity College Dublin
- Occupations: Writer; Author; Photographer; Businesswoman
- Years active: 2008–present
- Website: nessasfamilykitchen.blogspot.com

Nessa Robins is an Irish food writer, blogger and photographer from County Westmeath, Ireland. She is best known for her award-winning cookbook and food blog. She also writes a monthly recipe column in the Irish Farmers Journal.

== Early life ==
Robins grew up in Moate, County Westmeath, Ireland. She trained as a nurse in St. James's Hospital, Dublin, before completing a bachelor's degree in nursing studies in Trinity College Dublin. She worked in many areas of nursing until having her third child.

== Food career ==
In 2008, Robins took a break from nursing to pursue a career in food. She hosted cookery classes from her hometown and gave live demonstrations at many food festivals in Ireland, including Bloom, Taste of Dublin and at the National Ploughing Championships alongside Irish chef Neven Maguire.

Robins started a blog in 2010 called Nessa's Family Kitchen, for which she was named the Best Newcomer at the 2011 Irish Blog Awards. In May 2013 her first book, Apron Strings: Recipes from a Family Kitchen, was published by New Island Books. The book went on to win 'Best First Cookbook' in Ireland in the Gourmand Cookbook Awards. Robins currently writes a monthly column, Home Nurse, in the Irish Farmers Journal based on recipes from the cookbook.

Robins is also a member of the Irish Food Writers' Guild. She has also worked as an ambassador for Lidl and Flora.

== Personal life ==
Robins lives in Moate, County Westmeath with her husband Diarmuid and their four children.

== Filmography ==
Year	Title	Role	Notes
2010	His & Hers	Self	Documentary
2010, 2015	The Restaurant	Guest diner	2 episodes
2011	Ireland AM	Self	2 episodes
2012	Craig Doyle Live	Self	1 episode
2016	Food Paradise International	Self	Season 2, Episode 3: "Sandwich Paradise"
2018	Ear to the Ground	Self	1 episode

== Bibliography ==
2013: Apron Strings: Recipes from a Family Kitchen ISBN 978-1848402416

2014: Nessa's Christmas Kitchen
