= Aidan Davitt =

Irish politician (born 1978)

Senator Aidan Davitt
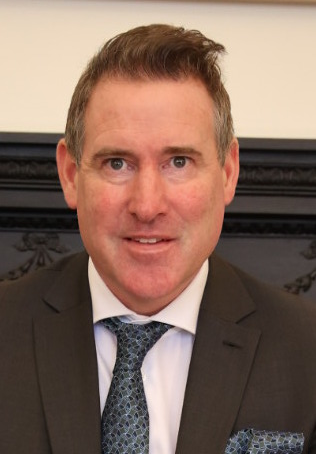

Senator
- Incumbent
- Assumed office 8 June 2016
- Constituency: Industrial and Commercial Panel

Personal details
- Born: 13 October 1978 (age 47) Mullingar, County Westmeath, Ireland
- Party: Fianna Fáil
- Spouse: Gillian Davitt (m. 2006)
- Children: 2
- Education: Senior College Dún Laoghaire
- Website: aidandavitt.webs.com

Aidan Davitt (born 13 October 1978) is an Irish Fianna Fáil politician who has served as a senator for the Industrial and Commercial Panel since April 2016.

He was a member of Westmeath County Council from 2009 to 2016. He is the Fianna Fáil Seanad spokesperson for Public Expenditure and Reform.

Following his involvement in the Oireachtas Golf Society scandal ("Golfgate") in August 2020, Davitt was one of six senators who lost the party whip in the Seanad as punishment for their actions. Davitt is a member of the cross-party Oireachtas Friends of Israel in the Oireachtas.
