= Mullingar Arts Centre =

Municipal building in Templemore, County Tipperary, Ireland

- Áras Ealaíne An Muileann gCearr
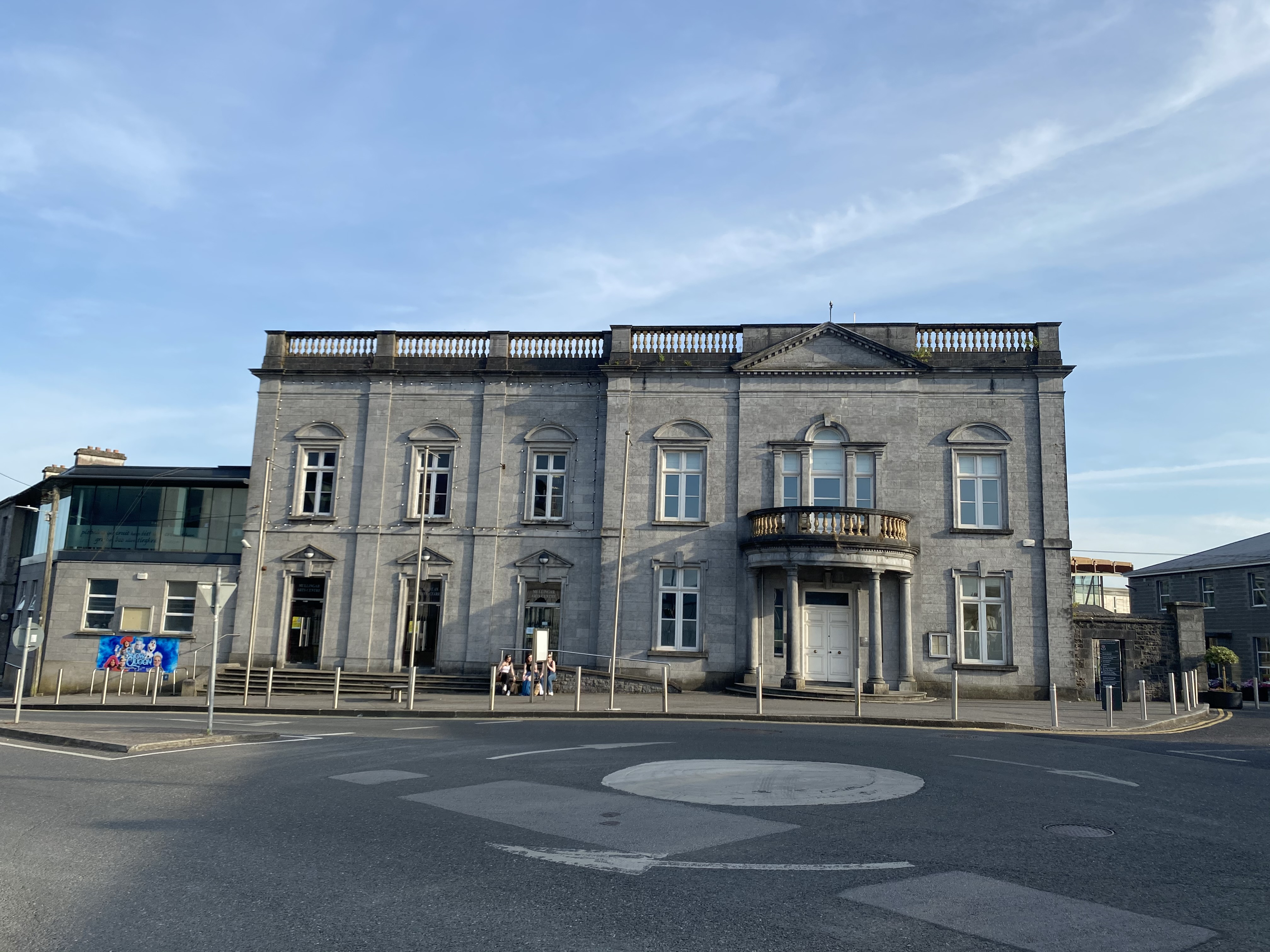
- Mullingar Arts Centre

- Location within Ireland

General information
- Architectural style: Neoclassical style
- Location: Mount Street, Mullingar, Ireland
- Coordinates: 53.5238°N 7.3404°W
- Completed: 1913

Design and construction
- Architect: Arthur Edward Joyce

Mullingar Arts Centre (Irish: Áras Ealaíne An Muileann gCearr), is a municipal building in Mount Street, Mullingar, County Westmeath, Ireland. Formerly known as County Hall, it was the meeting place of both Westmeath County Council and Mullingar Town Council.

== History ==
The building was commissioned as the offices and meeting place for Westmeath County Council. The site selected was previously occupied by the old county gaol which was built in the late 18th century. The building was designed by the county surveyor, Arthur Edward Joyce, in the neoclassical style, built in ashlar limestone and was officially opened by the future first President of Ireland, Douglas Hyde, as "County Hall" in 1913.

The design involved an asymmetrical main frontage of six bays facing onto Mount Street. The right-hand section of three bays, which was slightly projected forward, featured a semi-circular portico, formed by Doric order columns supporting an entablature and a balustraded parapet, in the central bay. Above the portico, there was a Venetian window and, at roof level, there was a modillioned pediment. The outer bays of the right-hand section were fenestrated by casement windows with moulded surrounds and keystones on the ground floor and by casement windows with moulded surrounds and segmental pediments on the first floor. The left-hand section of three bays was fenestrated by casement windows with moulded surrounds and triangular pediments on the ground floor and by casement windows with moulded surrounds and segmental pediments on the first floor. The right hand section and the individual bays of the left-hand section were flanked by full height pilasters supporting a balustraded parapet.

At an early stage, the building also became the offices and meeting place of the town commissioners for Mullingar. Films were first shown in the building in the 1930s and continued to be shown there until the mid-1940s. The building became an important venue for public events: the actor and future playwright, Harold Pinter, appeared on stage in the 1950s, the future Taoiseach, Albert Reynolds, gave a speech to a large audience, on being selected as Fianna Fáil candidate for the Longford–Westmeath constituency in the 1977 general election, and the pop singer, Joe Dolan, took part in a concert there in 1995.

An extensive programme of refurbishment works, intended to create a performing arts centre with a 400-seat theatre, was undertaken by Glenman Corporation at a cost of £1.4 million in the late 20th century. After completion of the works, the building was officially re-opened by the Minister for Public Enterprise, Mary O'Rourke, on 19 November 1998.

In 2002 the town commissioners, who continued to be based there, were replaced by Mullingar Town Council. Meanwhile, the county council moved to modern facilities in Lynn Road in 2009. The building ceased to be the local seat of government in 2014, when the town council was dissolved and administration of the town was amalgamated with Westmeath County Council in accordance with the Local Government Reform Act 2014.
