= Westmeath County Council =

Local authority of County Westmeath, Ireland

Westmeath County Council Comhairle Chontae na hIarmhí

Type
- Type: County council of County Westmeath

History
- Founded: 1 April 1899

Leadership
- Cathaoirleach: Bill Collentine, FF

Structure
- Seats: 20
- Political groups: Fianna Fáil (9) Fine Gael (4) Labour (2) Sinn Féin (2) Independent Ireland (1) Independent (2)

Elections
- Last election: 7 June 2024

Motto
- Irish: Triath ós Triathaibh "Noble above nobility"

Meeting place
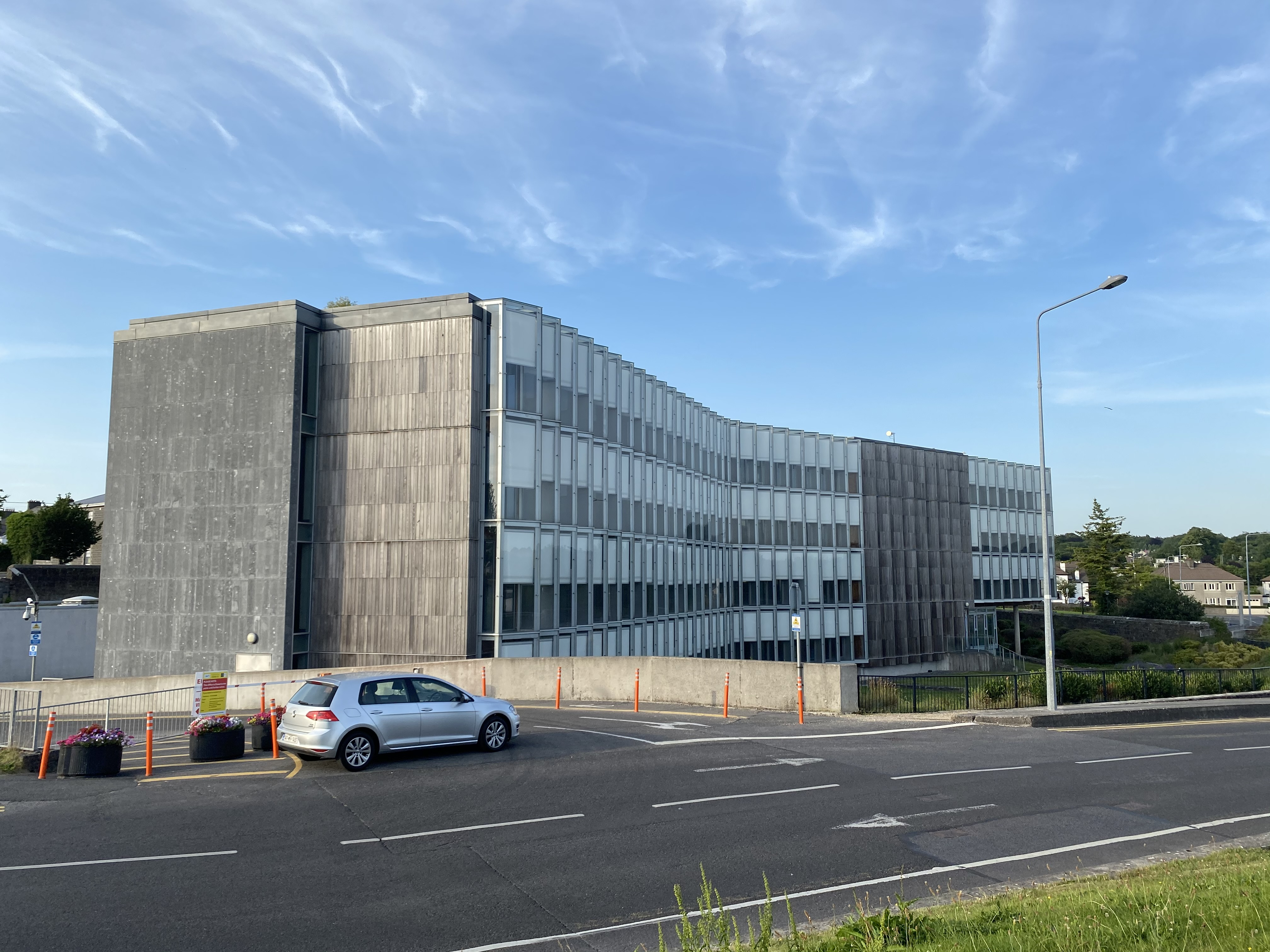
- County Buildings, Mullingar

Website
- Official website

The area governed by the council

Westmeath County Council (Irish: Comhairle Chontae na hIarmhí) is the local authority of County Westmeath, Ireland. As a county council, it is governed by the Local Government Act 2001. The council is responsible for housing and community, roads and transportation, urban planning and development, amenity and culture, and environment. The council has 20 elected members. Elections are held every five years and are by single transferable vote. The head of the council has the title of Cathaoirleach (chairperson). The county administration is headed by a chief executive, Pat Gallagher. The county town is Mullingar.

== History ==
Westmeath County Council was established on 1 April 1899 under the Local Government (Ireland) Act 1898 for the administrative county of County Westmeath. It succeeded the judicial county of Westmeath, with the addition of the part of the town of Athlone in County Roscommon.

Originally Westmeath County Council held its meetings in Mullingar Courthouse. The council commissioned a purpose-built facility, known as County Hall, in Mount Street in Mullingar in the early 20th century. In the early part of the 21st century it occupied a historic building on the same site associated with the old county gaol. It then moved to more modern facilities at the new County Buildings, to the south of the previous facility, in 2009.

== Regional Assembly ==
Westmeath County Council has two representatives on the Eastern and Midland Regional Assembly who are part of the Midland Strategic Planning Area Committee.

== Elections ==
The Local Government (Ireland) Act 1919 introduced the electoral system of proportional representation by means of the single transferable vote (PR-STV) for the 1920 Irish local elections. County Westmeath was divided into 6 county electoral areas to elect the 23 members of the council. This electoral system has been retained, with 20 members of Westmeath County Council now elected for a five-year term of office from 4 multi-member local electoral areas (LEAs).

Year	FF	FG	Lab	GP	SF	II	Ind.	Total
2024	9	4	2	0	2	1	2	20
2019	9	5	2	2	0	—N/a	2	20
2014	8	5	2	0	3	—N/a	2	20
2009	9	8	6	0	0	—N/a	0	23
2004	9	8	6	0	0	—N/a	0	23
1999	12	6	5	0	0	—N/a	0	23
1991	12	6	4	0	0	—N/a	1	23
1985	13	5	3	0	0	—N/a	2	23

== Local electoral areas and municipal districts ==
County Westmeath is divided into LEAs, defined by electoral divisions, for the purposes of local elections, and into municipal districts for the purposes of local exercising of the powers of the local authority.

Municipal district	LEA	Definition	Seats
Athlone	Athlone	Athlone East Rural, Athlone East Urban, Athlone West Urban, Auburn, Carn, Castledaly, Doonis, Glassan, Killinure, Moydrum, Muckanagh and Tubbrit.	5
Athlone	Moate	Ardnaglew, Ardnagragh, Ballinalack, Ballybroder, Ballykilmore, Ballymore, Ballymorin, Ballynagore, Bellanalack, Carrick, Castletown, Churchtown, Clonfad, Drumraney, Dysart, Emper, Glenlough, Greenpark, Jamestown, Kilbeggan, Kilbixy, Kilcumreragh, Killare, Lauree, Middleton, Moate, Mount Temple, Newtown, Noughaval, Piercetown, Portloman, Rahugh, Rathconrath, Rathowen, Skeagh, Sonna, Streamstown, Templepatrick, Umma and Winetown.	4
Mullingar	Mullingar	Belvidere, Castle, Cloghan, Heathstown, Hopestown, Knockdrin, Mullingar North Urban, Mullingar Rural, Mullingar South Urban, Owel, Russellstown and Tullaghan.	6
Mullingar	Kinnegad	Ballinlough, Ballyhealy, Ballynaskeagh, Boherquill, Bracklin, Castlelost, Clonarney, Clonlost, Collinstown, Coole, Coolure, Copperalley, Delvin, Derrymore, Enniscoffey, Faughalstown, Finnea, Fore East, Fore West, Gaybrook, Glore, Griffinstown, Hilltown, Huntingdon, Kilcumny, Killua, Killucan, Killulagh, Kilpatrick, Kinnegad, Kinturk, Knockarrow, Lackan, Milltown, Multyfarnham, Raharney, Riverdale, Rosmead, Stonehall, Street, Taghmon and Woodland.	5

== Councillors ==
The following were elected at the 2024 Westmeath County Council election.

=== 2024 seats summary ===
Party	Seats
Fianna Fáil	9
Fine Gael	4
Labour	2
Sinn Féin	2
Independent Ireland	1
Independent	2

=== Councillors by electoral area ===
This list reflects the order in which councillors were elected on 7 June 2024.

Council members from 2024 election
Local electoral area	Name	Party
Athlone	Kevin "Boxer" Moran (Note: Replaced during term, see table below for details.)	Independent
Athlone	Frankie Keena	Fianna Fáil
Athlone	Aengus O'Rourke	Fianna Fáil
Athlone	John Dolan	Fine Gael
Athlone	Paul Hogan	Independent Ireland
Kinnegad	Denis Leonard	Labour
Kinnegad	Alfie Devine	Fianna Fáil
Kinnegad	David Jones	Sinn Féin
Kinnegad	Niall Gaffney	Fianna Fáil
Kinnegad	Emily Wallace	Fine Gael
Moate	Tom Farrell	Fine Gael
Moate	Vinny McCormack	Fianna Fáil
Moate	Liam McDaniel	Fianna Fáil
Moate	Johnnie Penrose	Labour
Mullingar	Mick Dollard	Independent
Mullingar	Ken Glynn	Fianna Fáil
Mullingar	Aoife Davitt	Fianna Fáil
Mullingar	Andrew Duncan	Fine Gael
Mullingar	Bill Collentine	Fianna Fáil
Mullingar	Julie McCourt	Sinn Féin

==== Co-options ====
Party	Outgoing	LEA	Reason	Date	Co-optee
Independent	Kevin "Boxer" Moran	Athlone	Elected to 34th Dáil at the 2024 general election	17 December 2024	John Gibbons
