= Kevin "Boxer" Moran =

Irish politician (born 1967)

Kevin "Boxer" Moran TD
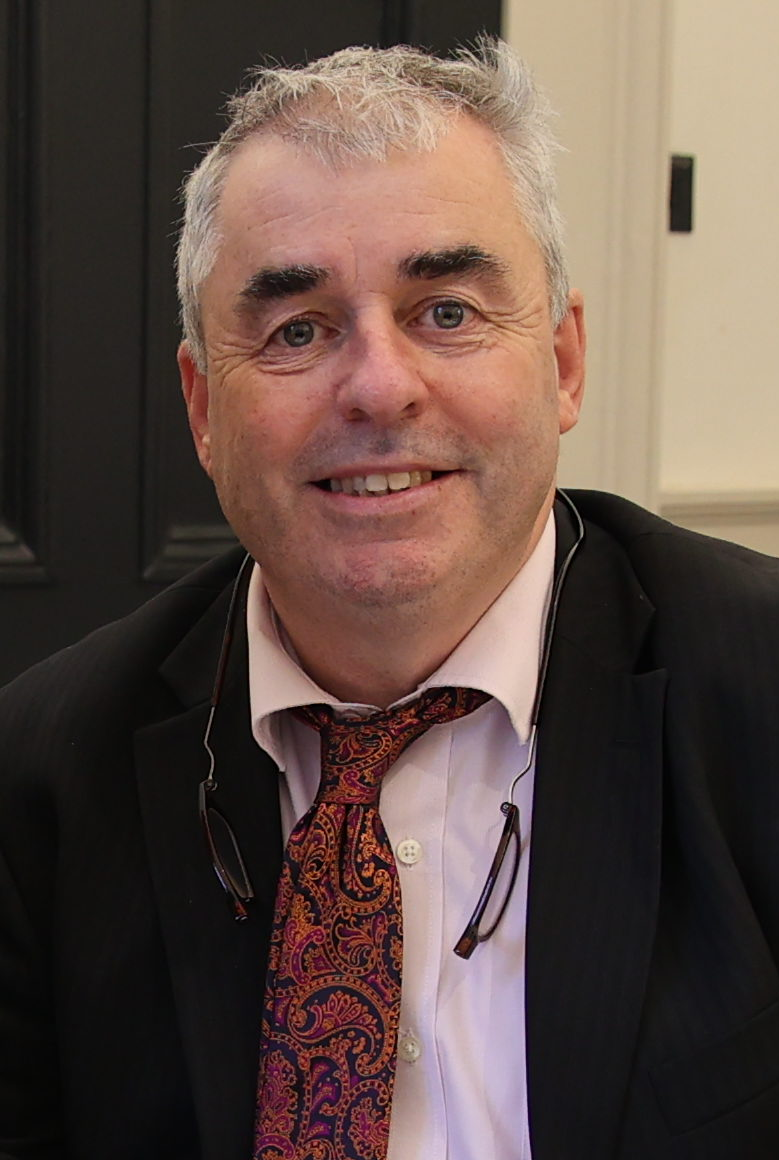
- Moran in 2024

Minister of State
- 2025–: Public Expenditure, Infrastructure, Public Service Reform and Digitalisation
- 2017–2020: Public Expenditure and Reform

Teachta Dála
- Incumbent
- Assumed office November 2024
- In office February 2016 – February 2020
- Constituency: Longford–Westmeath

Personal details
- Born: 9 April 1967 (age 59) Athlone, County Westmeath, Ireland
- Party: Independent
- Other political affiliations: Fianna Fáil (until 2011)
- Spouse: Michelle Fagg (m. 1999)
- Children: 2

Kevin Moran (born 9 April 1967) is an Irish independent politician who has served as a Minister of State since January 2025, having previously served from 2017 to 2020. He has been a Teachta Dála (TD) for the Longford–Westmeath constituency since the 2024 general election, and previously from 2016 to 2020. He was a member of Westmeath County Council from June to November 2024.

== Political career ==
He was a member of Westmeath County Council from 1999 to 2016, and represented Fianna Fáil until 2011. In January 2006, he contested Fianna Fáil's nomination to stand at the 2007 general election, being narrowly defeated by Mary O'Rourke. He contested the 2014 by-election as an independent candidate, but failed to win a seat. He joined the Independent Alliance ahead of the 2016 general election. Moran was elected to Dáil Éireann at the 2016 general election. After lengthy government formation talks, the Independent Alliance supported the nomination of Enda Kenny as Taoiseach on 6 May 2016, allowing Kenny to become the first leader of Fine Gael to be re-elected to this office.

On 3 June 2017, he was appointed by the government as Minister of State at the Department of Public Expenditure and Reform with responsibility for the Office of Public Works and Flood Relief. This was part of arrangement with fellow Independent Alliance TD Seán Canney, who had been serving in that position. Moran's appointment lapsed on the resignation of Enda Kenny as Taoiseach later that month on 14 June. On 20 June 2017, Moran was appointed by the government formed by Leo Varadkar to the same position.

He lost his seat at the 2020 general election, continuing to serve as a minister of state until the formation of a new government on 27 June 2020.

In January 2022, he was expected to become a member of Westmeath County Council after his son Jamie resigned his position on the council due to work commitments. However his admission was not accepted by the majority of the incumbent council.

He was elected at the 2024 Westmeath County Council election, topping the poll with 39.64% of the vote and being elected on the first count. At the 2024 general election, he regained a seat in Longford–Westmeath. In January 2025, he was appointed as Minister of State at the Department of Public Expenditure, Infrastructure, Public Service Reform and Digitalisation with responsibility for the Office of Public Works.

== Personal life ==
Moran has said that he left school in his early teens due to severe, undiagnosed dyslexia and associated literacy difficulties. He has described attempting to conceal his difficulties at school by acting as a troublemaker so that he would be removed from class, and one local report stated that he was expelled from Marist College (Athlone) after a matter of weeks before leaving education completely. After leaving school, he worked in the building trade and later became self-employed, developing a taxi business in Athlone; he has continued to be described in media profiles as a taxi driver.

Moran has spoken publicly about mental health difficulties, including depression and panic attacks, and about an attempt to take his own life when he was a young man. He has said that the death of his younger brother in a motorcycle accident contributed to a difficult period in his life, and that he later decided to speak openly after hearing public criticism relating to his education. Following his television interview on the subject, Moran told The Irish Times he received extensive correspondence from people affected by mental health and literacy issues and planned a meeting to bring people with literacy difficulties and mental health problems together with government ministers.

In interviews, Moran has described dyslexia-related barriers affecting adults in employment and training, and he has said that people contacted him after his televised interview to describe difficulties with written examinations and access to supports.

Moran is married to Michelle Fagg and has two children. In 2024, he publicly thanked his wife and wider family for their support and discussed the impact of abusive commentary on social media on political families.

According to a Government of Ireland biography, Moran has been involved in organising community events in Athlone (including the Athlone St Patrick’s Day Parade and local festivals) and is a sports enthusiast with interests including angling; he has also been described as a long-time supporter of Athlone Town F.C. and local GAA and rugby events. A 2016 profile in The Irish Times described him as a keen angler who had promoted amenities around Lough Ree and been involved in flood-relief volunteering in Athlone.

Moran is often referred to by the nickname "Boxer", a nickname which arose from him hitting an opponent in a football game at the age of 12.

Political offices
Preceded by Seán Canney; Eoghan Murphy	Minister of State at the Department of Public Expenditure and Reform; 2017–2020; With: Patrick O'Donovan	Succeeded by Patrick O'Donovan; Ossian Smyth
Preceded by Kieran O'Donnell; Ossian Smyth	Minister of State at the Department of Public Expenditure, Infrastructure, Public Service Reform and Digitalisation; 2025–present With: Emer Higgins	Incumbent

Dáil	Election	Deputy (Party)	Deputy (Party)	Deputy (Party)	Deputy (Party)	Deputy (Party)
2nd	1921	Lorcan Robbins (SF)	Seán Mac Eoin (SF)	Joseph McGuinness (SF)	Laurence Ginnell (SF)	4 seats 1921–1923
3rd	1922	John Lyons (Lab)	Seán Mac Eoin (PT-SF)	Francis McGuinness (PT-SF)	Laurence Ginnell (AT-SF)	4 seats 1921–1923
4th	1923	John Lyons (Ind.)	Conor Byrne (Rep)	James Killane (Rep)	Patrick Shaw (CnaG)	Patrick McKenna (FP)
5th	1927 (Jun)	Henry Broderick (Lab)	Michael Kennedy (FF)	James Victory (FF)	Patrick Shaw (CnaG)	Hugh Garahan (FP)
6th	1927 (Sep)	Henry Broderick (Lab)	Michael Kennedy (FF)	James Killane (FF)	Patrick Shaw (CnaG)	Michael Connolly (CnaG)
6th	1930 by-election	Henry Broderick (Lab)	Michael Kennedy (FF)	James Geoghegan (FF)	Patrick Shaw (CnaG)	Michael Connolly (CnaG)
7th	1932	Francis Gormley (FF)	Michael Kennedy (FF)	James Geoghegan (FF)	Patrick Shaw (CnaG)	Seán Mac Eoin (CnaG)
8th	1933	James Victory (FF)	Michael Kennedy (FF)	James Geoghegan (FF)	Charles Fagan (NCP)	Seán Mac Eoin (CnaG)
9th	1937	Constituency abolished. See Athlone–Longford and Meath–Westmeath				

Dáil	Election	Deputy (Party)	Deputy (Party)	Deputy (Party)	Deputy (Party)	Deputy (Party)
13th	1948	Erskine H. Childers (FF)	Thomas Carter (FF)	Michael Kennedy (FF)	Seán Mac Eoin (FG)	Charles Fagan (Ind.)
14th	1951	Erskine H. Childers (FF)	Frank Carter (FF)	Michael Kennedy (FF)	Seán Mac Eoin (FG)	Charles Fagan (Ind.)
15th	1954	Erskine H. Childers (FF)	Frank Carter (FF)	Michael Kennedy (FF)	Seán Mac Eoin (FG)	Charles Fagan (FG)
16th	1957	Erskine H. Childers (FF)	Ruairí Ó Brádaigh (SF)	Michael Kennedy (FF)	Seán Mac Eoin (FG)	Charles Fagan (FG)
17th	1961	Frank Carter (FF)	Joe Sheridan (Ind.)	Michael Kennedy (FF)	Seán Mac Eoin (FG)	4 seats 1961–1992
18th	1965	Frank Carter (FF)	Joe Sheridan (Ind.)	Patrick Lenihan (FF)	Gerry L'Estrange (FG)	4 seats 1961–1992
19th	1969	Frank Carter (FF)	Joe Sheridan (Ind.)	Patrick Lenihan (FF)	Gerry L'Estrange (FG)	4 seats 1961–1992
19th	1970 by-election	Frank Carter (FF)	Joe Sheridan (Ind.)	Patrick Cooney (FG)	Gerry L'Estrange (FG)	4 seats 1961–1992
20th	1973	Frank Carter (FF)	Joe Sheridan (Ind.)	Patrick Cooney (FG)	Gerry L'Estrange (FG)	4 seats 1961–1992
21st	1977	Albert Reynolds (FF)	Joe Sheridan (Ind.)	Seán Keegan (FF)	Gerry L'Estrange (FG)	4 seats 1961–1992
22nd	1981	Albert Reynolds (FF)	Patrick Cooney (FG)	Seán Keegan (FF)	Gerry L'Estrange (FG)	4 seats 1961–1992
23rd	1982 (Feb)	Albert Reynolds (FF)	Patrick Cooney (FG)	Seán Keegan (FF)	Gerry L'Estrange (FG)	4 seats 1961–1992
24th	1982 (Nov)	Albert Reynolds (FF)	Patrick Cooney (FG)	Mary O'Rourke (FF)	Gerry L'Estrange (FG)	4 seats 1961–1992
25th	1987	Albert Reynolds (FF)	Patrick Cooney (FG)	Mary O'Rourke (FF)	Henry Abbott (FF)	4 seats 1961–1992
26th	1989	Albert Reynolds (FF)	Louis Belton (FG)	Mary O'Rourke (FF)	Paul McGrath (FG)	4 seats 1961–1992
27th	1992	Constituency abolished. See Longford–Roscommon and Westmeath				

Dáil	Election	Deputy (Party)	Deputy (Party)	Deputy (Party)	Deputy (Party)	Deputy (Party)
30th	2007	Willie Penrose (Lab)	Peter Kelly (FF)	Mary O'Rourke (FF)	James Bannon (FG)	4 seats 2007–2024
31st	2011	Willie Penrose (Lab)	Robert Troy (FF)	Nicky McFadden (FG)	James Bannon (FG)	4 seats 2007–2024
31st	2014 by-election	Willie Penrose (Lab)	Robert Troy (FF)	Gabrielle McFadden (FG)	James Bannon (FG)	4 seats 2007–2024
32nd	2016	Willie Penrose (Lab)	Robert Troy (FF)	Kevin "Boxer" Moran (Ind.)	Peter Burke (FG)	4 seats 2007–2024
33rd	2020	Sorca Clarke (SF)	Robert Troy (FF)	Joe Flaherty (FF)	Peter Burke (FG)	4 seats 2007–2024
34th	2024	Sorca Clarke (SF)	Robert Troy (FF)	Kevin "Boxer" Moran (Ind.)	Peter Burke (FG)	Micheál Carrigy (FG)
