= Moate =

Town in County Westmeath in Ireland

Moate An Móta (Irish)
- Town
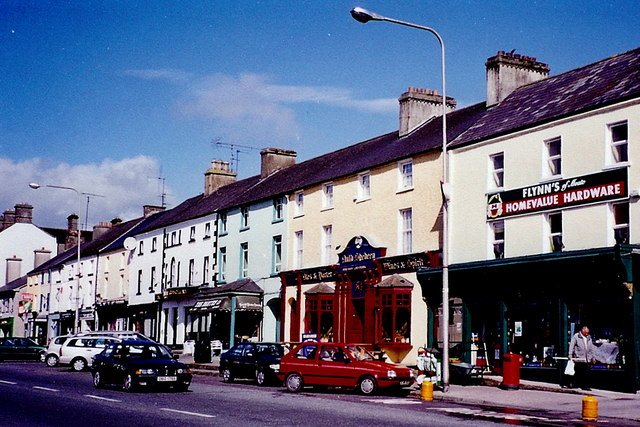
- Main Street (R446 road)

- Location in Ireland
- Coordinates: 53.3954°N 7.7205°W
- Country: Ireland
- Province: Leinster
- County: County Westmeath
- Dáil Éireann: Longford–Westmeath

Area
  - Total: 1.943 km^{2} (0.750 sq mi)
- Elevation: 72 m (236 ft)

Population (2022)
  - Total: 3,013
  - Density: 1,551/km^{2} (4,016/sq mi)
- Time zone: UTC±0 (WET)
  - Summer (DST): UTC+1 (IST)
- Eircode routing key: N37
- Telephone area code: +353(0)90
- Irish Grid Reference: N182383

Moate (/moʊt/; Irish: An Móta) is a town in County Westmeath, Ireland. As of the 2022 census, it had a population of 3,013.

The town's Irish name, An Móta, is derived from the term motte-and-bailey, as the Normans built an example of this type of fortification here. The earthwork is still visible behind the buildings on the main street.

The town later became an important marketplace and Quaker village. It made the town more wealthy than equivalent towns in Leinster. There are several extant examples of Quaker houses on the main street, which itself is typical of an Irish marketplace.

== Location ==
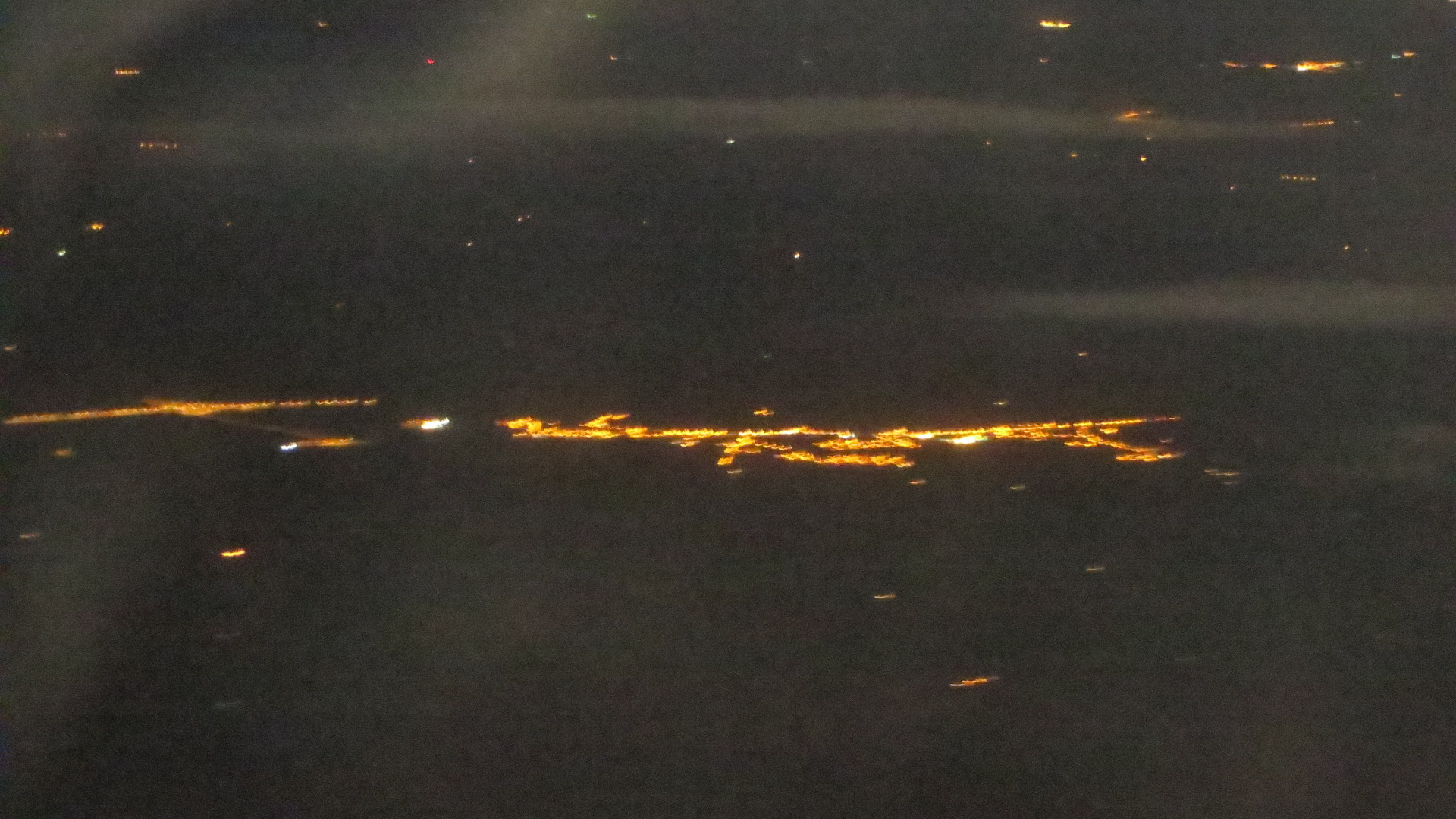
Nocturnal aerial view of the town

Moate is on the Cloghatanny River, also known as the Moate Stream, which is a tributary of the River Brosna. The confluence between the Cloghatanny and Brosna is 7.5 kilometres (4.7 mi) to the southeast of Moate.

The town is on the R446 road between Kinnegad and Athlone. Before July 2008, this was the N6 road, a national primary route, and Moate was a serious traffic bottleneck. The new M6 motorway bypasses the town.

== Amenities ==
Moate, which doubled in population (from 1,520 to 3,013) between the 2002 and 2022 census, is home to a number of businesses, several supermarkets, a post office, pharmacy, coffee shops, restaurants, pubs and a hotel. The area also has an amenity and heritage park, a greenway running through the town, golf club, tennis courts, sports pitch, a pastoral centre and a community centre.

=== Parks ===
Dún na Sí Amenity and Heritage Park is a community park located on the outskirts of the town, encompassing ecology, play, heritage, arts and education. The park comprises the Scéal Exhibition in the Comhaltas Teach Cheoil, heritage trail, sensory garden, pet farm, walking trails, native Irish woodland, turlough, playground and tea rooms.

Another park, Patrick Kelly Memorial Park, opened in December 2008. This memorial park is named after the only Irish soldier to die in combat in Ireland since the end of the Irish Civil War. On 16 December 1983, Private Patrick Kelly, who was from Moate, was attempting to free American businessman Don Tidey, who had been kidnapped by the Irish Republican Army. Along with Garda recruit Gary Sheehan, he was killed in a shoot-out with IRA gunmen at Derrada Woods in Ballinamore, County Leitrim.

== Culture and heritage ==
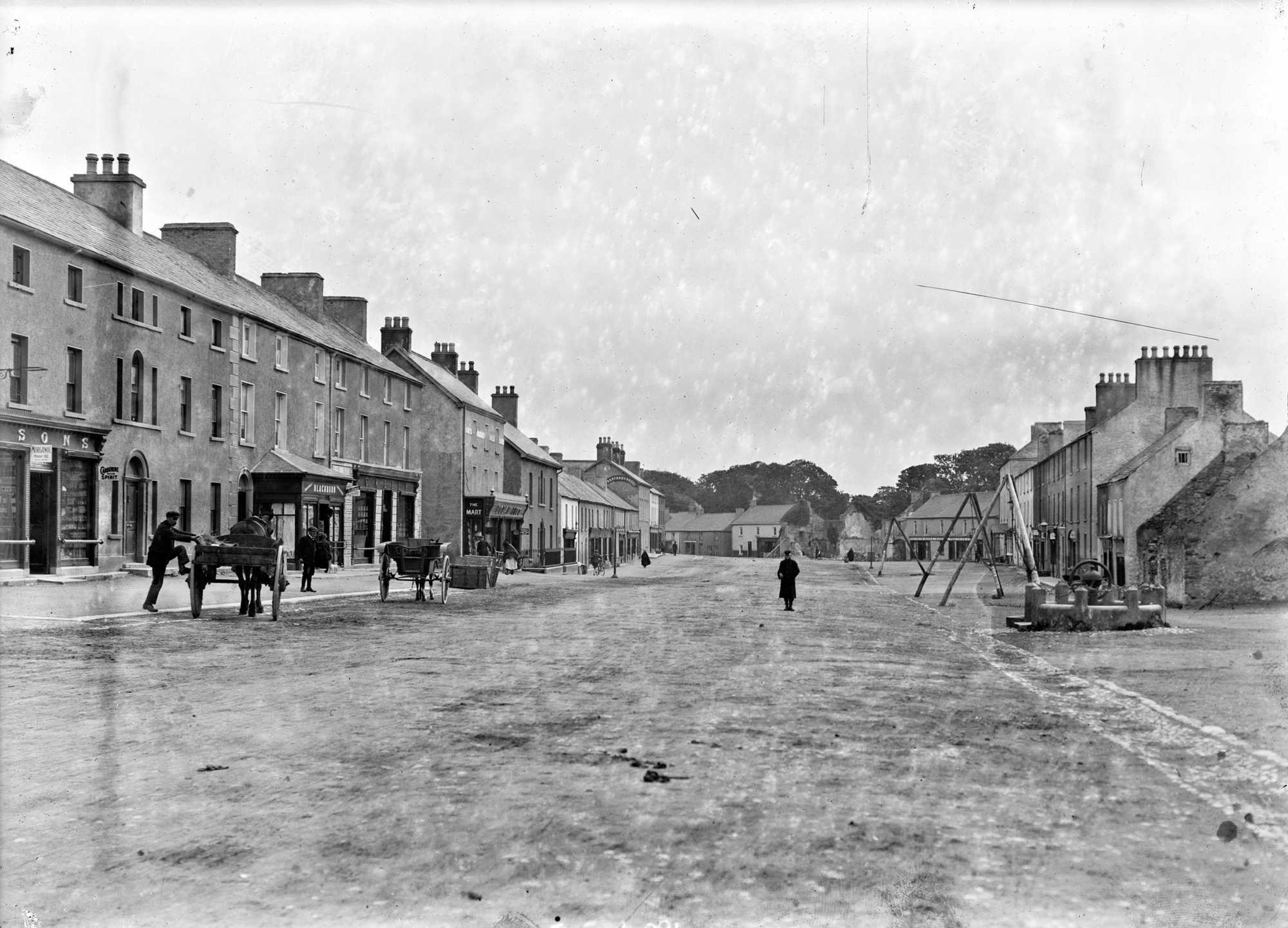
Main Street, Moate c1910s

The local Gaelic football club is the Moate All Whites. The club's name and playing kit colours are based on the white religious habits worn by the Carmelite White Friars, a long established Moate institution.

Tuar Ard Arts Centre is a community-lead project which opened in October 2000. The centre has tiered seating in an auditorium that seats 173 people.

The former gaol, part of the old courthouse, contains a small museum housing artefacts found in the area dating from the Stone Age through to the modern era. The main building of the old courthouse has been renovated into a public library.

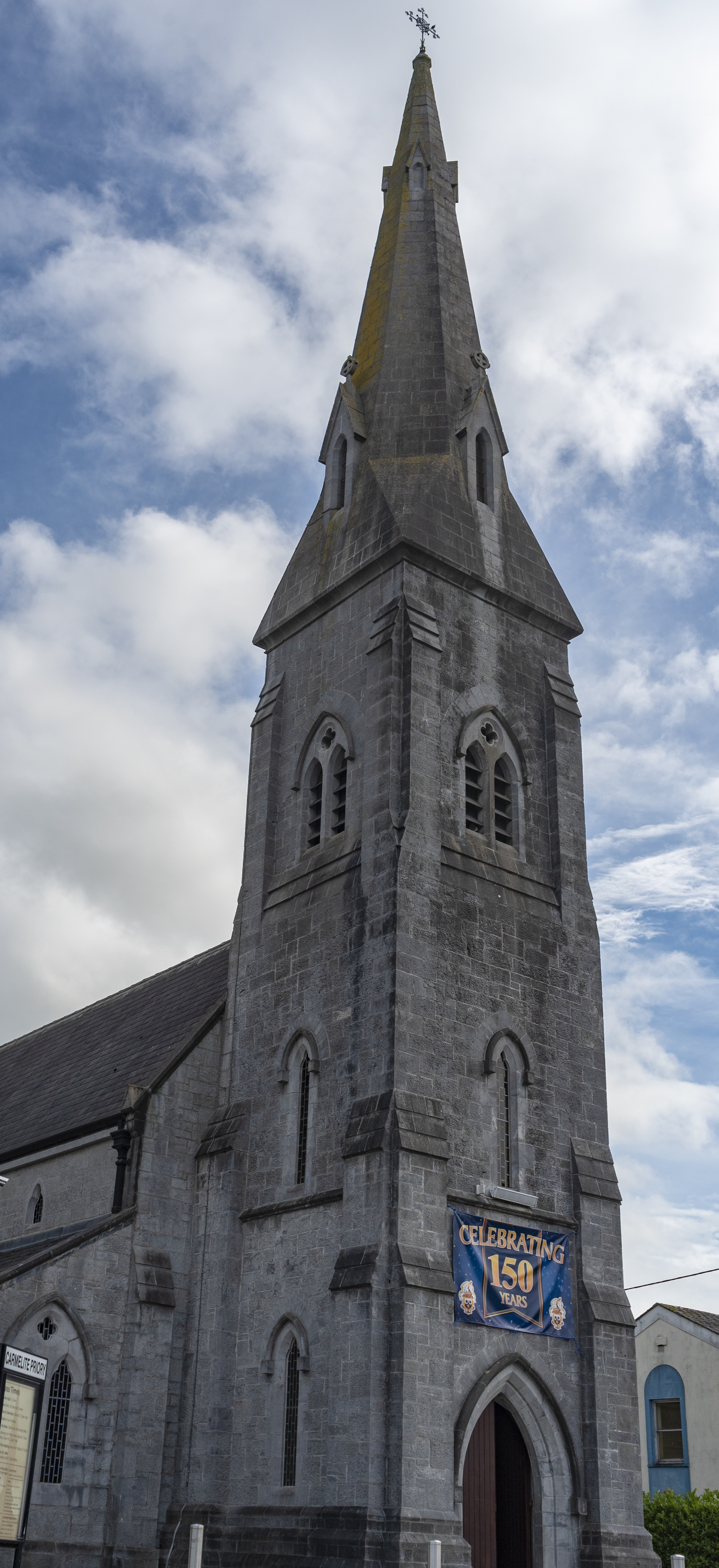
Church of the Immaculate Conception, Moate

A 17th-century ruined Quaker Meetinghouse stands in the centre of the town, the Church of St. Patrick serves as the Catholic parish church and the Church of St. Mary is the local Church of Ireland church. A second Catholic church, the Church of the Immaculate Conception, stands to the north of the town.

== Transport ==
=== Bus ===
Bus Éireann and Irish Citylink operate Dublin–Galway bus routes that service Moate.

=== Rail ===
The disused Moate railway station was built by the Midland Great Western Railway to connect Dublin and Galway and opened on 1 August 1851. It closed for goods traffic on 2 December 1974, and closed for passenger traffic on 27 January 1987. Parts of the film The First Great Train Robbery (1979) were filmed on the local railway. The crew of about 150 actors, extras, and production team, spent around two weeks in and around Moate filming. The cast of the movie stayed at the Royal Hoey Hotel during this time. The train station depicted as "Ashford" is actually Moate Station.

=== Dublin to Galway Cycleway ===
The Mullingar (West) to Garrycastle (Athlone East) section of the Dublin-Galway Greenway (cycleway) was opened on 3 October 2015 by the Taoiseach Enda Kenny in Moate. The cycleway links Moate to Athlone and Mullingar on a 3m wide 40 km long cycleway.

== Climate ==
Climate data for Moate, Westmeath
Month	Jan	Feb	Mar	Apr	May	Jun	Jul	Aug	Sep	Oct	Nov	Dec	Year
Mean daily maximum °C (°F)	10 (50)	10.6 (51.1)	12.3 (54.1)	14.1 (57.4)	17.8 (64.0)	20.1 (68.2)	23.4 (74.1)	22.8 (73.0)	18.9 (66.0)	16.3 (61.3)	11.9 (53.4)	10.6 (51.1)	15.7 (60.3)
Mean daily minimum °C (°F)	−3.1 (26.4)	−1.6 (29.1)	−0.3 (31.5)	1.1 (34.0)	3.5 (38.3)	6.9 (44.4)	9.3 (48.7)	7.8 (46.0)	5.7 (42.3)	3.3 (37.9)	0.2 (32.4)	−0.3 (31.5)	2.7 (36.9)
Source: The Weather Channel

== Education ==
=== Primary ===
Moate has two primary schools: St. Brigid's Primary School on Station Road, formerly known as Convent Primary School, is co-educational and was founded by the Sisters of Mercy in 1861. The other is St. Oliver Plunkett Boys' Primary School on Lake Road.

=== Secondary ===
The town's secondary school is Moate Community School on Church Street. It was created on September 1, 1996 by combining three schools: the Convent of Mercy Secondary School, the Carmelite College secondary school, and Moate Vocational School. A new building opened in the school in 2002 containing a gymnasium, four new science laboratories, a home economics room, art room, lecture hall, technical drawing classroom and an oratory as well as general classrooms and offices. It has approximately 1,250 students (including Moate Business College) and a staff of 130. The business college provides courses including performance arts and information technology.

== Notable people ==
- Abraham Boulger, Victoria Cross recipient
- T.R. Dallas, singer
- Patrick Kelly, soldier
- Ray Lynam, country singer
- Colm Murray, sports broadcaster
- Lorcan Robbins, (1884/85–1939), activist and politician
- Nessa Robins, food writer
- Joe Ward, boxer
- William Duckett White (1807–1893), politician and member of the Queensland Legislative Council
