= Local electoral area =

District of local elections in Ireland

Dublin divided into its eleven local electoral areas, with dots symbolising members of Dublin City Council for each LEA

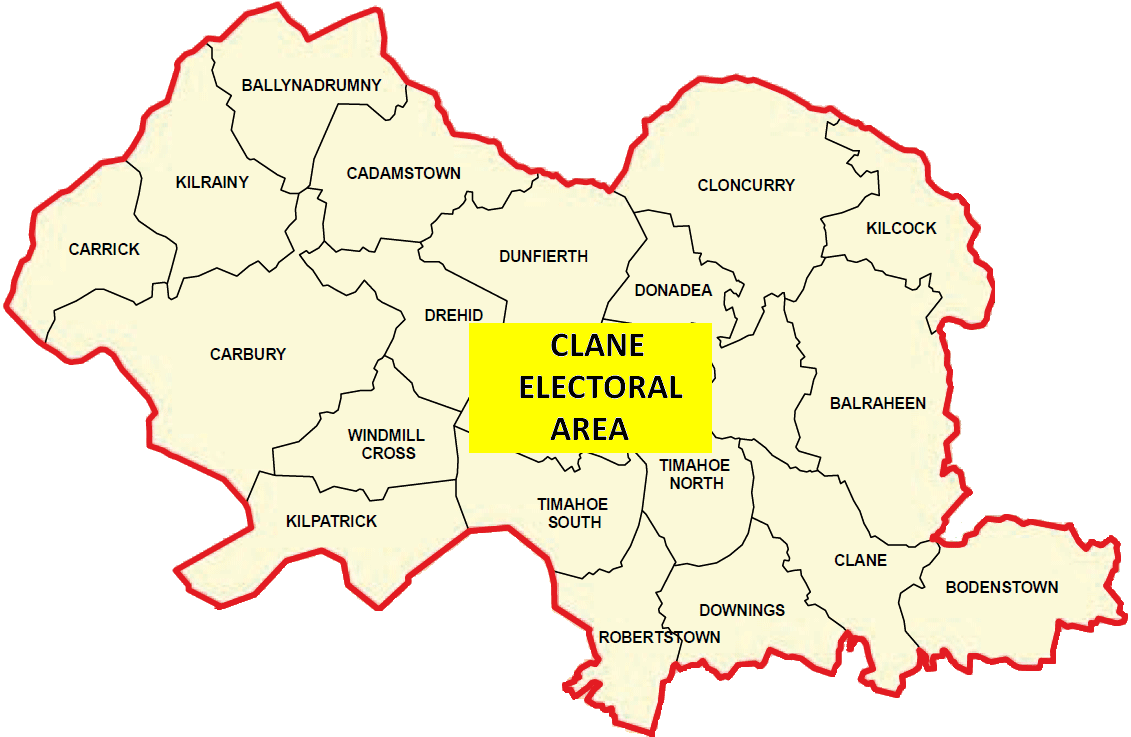
Clane LEA, County Kildare, shown divided into its electoral divisions (EDs).

A local electoral area (LEA; Irish: toghlimistéar áitiúil) is an electoral area for elections to local authorities in Ireland. All elections use the single transferable vote. Ireland is divided into 166 LEAs, with an average population of 28,700 and average area of 423.3 square kilometres (163.4 sq mi). The boundaries of LEAs are determined by order of the Minister for Housing, Local Government and Heritage, usually based on lower-level units called electoral divisions (EDs), with a total of 3,440 EDs in the state.

As well as their use for electoral purposes, LEAs are local administrative units in Eurostat NUTS classification. They are used in local numbers of cases of COVID-19.

== Municipal districts ==
A municipal district (Irish: ceantar bardasach) is a division of a local authority which can exercise certain powers of the local authority. They came into being on 1 June 2014, ten days after the local elections, under the provisions of the Local Government Reform Act 2014. Of the 31 local authorities, 25 are subdivided into municipal districts, which comprise one or more LEA. The exceptions are the three city councils (Cork City, Dublin City and Galway City) and the three county councils in Dublin (Dún Laoghaire–Rathdown, Fingal and South Dublin). A district associated with a city or borough is termed a metropolitan district (ceantar cathrach) or borough district (ceantar buirge) respectively.

In 2019, John Paul Phelan, Minister of State for Local Government and Electoral Reform, commented in the Dáil:

Municipal districts have an extensive list of functions currently, but the situation is haphazard ... some local authorities are better at performing some functions than others. I have found that some local authorities have a strong municipal district structure, with the districts being where most of the nitty-gritty work of local authorities is done, be it roads, footpaths or lights. Some do not have that structure, though, with decisions rehashed or debated again at the councils' plenary sessions.

== Boundary changes ==
Boundaries for local electoral areas and municipal district are determined by statutory instrument of the Minister for Housing, Local Government and Heritage. The Minister must first request the Electoral Commission to prepare a report. The minister must have regard to this report in making any changes.

Prior to the establishment of the Electoral Commission in 2023, recommendations on local electoral boundary changes were made by an independent boundary committee established for that purpose. A boundary committee has been required since 1994 for electoral areas. The 2012–13 Local Electoral Area Boundary Committee considered both administrative areas (municipal districts, though not counties/cities) and electoral areas. In 2015, separate committees were set up to consider adjustments to county and municipal boundaries passing through each of four urban areas: Athlone, Carlow, Drogheda, and Waterford. A Boundary Committee established in 2017 and which reported in June 2018 recommended alterations to municipal districts and local electoral areas which were implemented in December 2018.

== Current LEAs ==
Below are the districts and local electoral areas as defined by the most recent SI in each case and which were used at the 2019 local elections. The minister ultimately did not alter the areas for the 2024 local elections. Unless otherwise specified, districts are titled "Municipal District of Carlow", etc.

| Council | Seats | District | Local electoral area (LEA) | Seats |
|---|---|---|---|---|
| Carlow County Council | 18 | Carlow | | 7 |
| Carlow County Council | 18 | Muinebeag | | 5 |
| Carlow County Council | 18 | Tullow | | 6 |
| Cavan County Council | 18 | Bailieborough—Cootehill | | 6 |
| Cavan County Council | 18 | Ballyjamesduff | | 6 |
| Cavan County Council | 18 | Cavan–Belturbet | | 6 |
| Clare County Council | 28 | Ennis | | 7 |
| Clare County Council | 28 | Killaloe | | 5 |
| Clare County Council | 28 | Shannon | | 7 |
| Clare County Council | 28 | West Clare | Ennistymon | 4 |
| Clare County Council | 28 | West Clare | Kilrush | 5 |
| Cork City Council | 31 | | Cork City North-East | 6 |
| Cork City Council | 31 | | Cork City North-West | 6 |
| Cork City Council | 31 | | Cork City South-Central | 6 |
| Cork City Council | 31 | | Cork City South-East | 6 |
| Cork City Council | 31 | | Cork City South-West | 7 |
| Cork County Council | 55 | Bandon—Kinsale | | 6 |
| Cork County Council | 55 | Carrigaline | | 6 |
| Cork County Council | 55 | Cobh | | 6 |
| Cork County Council | 55 | East Cork | Midleton | 7 |
| Cork County Council | 55 | Fermoy | | 6 |
| Cork County Council | 55 | Kanturk—Mallow | Kanturk | 4 |
| Cork County Council | 55 | Kanturk—Mallow | Mallow | 5 |
| Cork County Council | 55 | Macroom | | 6 |
| Cork County Council | 55 | West Cork | Bantry—West Cork | 4 |
| Cork County Council | 55 | West Cork | Skibbereen—West Cork | 5 |
| Donegal County Council | 37 | Donegal | | 6 |
| Donegal County Council | 37 | Glenties | | 6 |
| Donegal County Council | 37 | Inishowen | Buncrana | 5 |
| Donegal County Council | 37 | Inishowen | Carndonagh | 4 |
| Donegal County Council | 37 | Letterkenny—Milford | Letterkenny | 7 |
| Donegal County Council | 37 | Letterkenny—Milford | Milford | 3 |
| Donegal County Council | 37 | Lifford—Stranorlar | | 6 |
| Dublin City Council | 63 | | Artane—Whitehall | 6 |
| Dublin City Council | 63 | | Ballyfermot—Drimnagh | 5 |
| Dublin City Council | 63 | | Ballymun—Finglas | 6 |
| Dublin City Council | 63 | | Cabra—Glasnevin | 7 |
| Dublin City Council | 63 | | Clontarf | 6 |
| Dublin City Council | 63 | | Donaghmede | 5 |
| Dublin City Council | 63 | | Kimmage—Rathmines | 6 |
| Dublin City Council | 63 | | North Inner City | 7 |
| Dublin City Council | 63 | | Pembroke | 5 |
| Dublin City Council | 63 | | South East Inner City | 5 |
| Dublin City Council | 63 | | South West Inner City | 5 |
| Dún Laoghaire–Rathdown County Council | 40 | | Blackrock | 6 |
| Dún Laoghaire–Rathdown County Council | 40 | | Dundrum | 7 |
| Dún Laoghaire–Rathdown County Council | 40 | | Dún Laoghaire | 7 |
| Dún Laoghaire–Rathdown County Council | 40 | | Glencullen—Sandyford | 7 |
| Dún Laoghaire–Rathdown County Council | 40 | | Killiney—Shankill | 6 |
| Dún Laoghaire–Rathdown County Council | 40 | | Stillorgan | 6 |
| Fingal County Council | 40 | | Balbriggan | 5 |
| Fingal County Council | 40 | | Blanchardstown—Mulhuddart | 5 |
| Fingal County Council | 40 | | Castleknock | 6 |
| Fingal County Council | 40 | | Howth—Malahide | 7 |
| Fingal County Council | 40 | | Ongar | 5 |
| Fingal County Council | 40 | | Rush—Lusk | 5 |
| Fingal County Council | 40 | | Swords | 7 |
| Galway City Council | 18 | | Galway City West | 6 |
| Galway City Council | 18 | | Galway City Central | 6 |
| Galway City Council | 18 | | Galway City East | 6 |
| Galway County Council | 39 | Athenry | Athenry—Oranmore | 7 |
| Galway County Council | 39 | Ballinasloe | | 6 |
| Galway County Council | 39 | Conamara | Conamara North | 4 |
| Galway County Council | 39 | Conamara | Conamara South | 5 |
| Galway County Council | 39 | Loughrea | Gort—Kinvara | 5 |
| Galway County Council | 39 | Loughrea | Loughrea | 5 |
| Galway County Council | 39 | Tuam | | 7 |
| Kerry County Council | 33 | An Daingean—Castleisland | An Daingean | 3 |
| Kerry County Council | 33 | An Daingean—Castleisland | Castleisland | 4 |
| Kerry County Council | 33 | Kenmare | | 6 |
| Kerry County Council | 33 | Killarney | | 7 |
| Kerry County Council | 33 | Listowel | | 6 |
| Kerry County Council | 33 | Tralee | | 7 |
| Kildare County Council | 40 | Athy | | 5 |
| Kildare County Council | 40 | Celbridge—Leixlip | Celbridge | 4 |
| Kildare County Council | 40 | Celbridge—Leixlip | Leixlip | 3 |
| Kildare County Council | 40 | Clane—Maynooth | Clane | 5 |
| Kildare County Council | 40 | Clane—Maynooth | Maynooth | 5 |
| Kildare County Council | 40 | Kildare—Newbridge | Kildare | 5 |
| Kildare County Council | 40 | Kildare—Newbridge | Newbridge | 6 |
| Kildare County Council | 40 | Naas | | 7 |
| Kilkenny County Council | 24 | Callan—Thomastown | | 6 |
| Kilkenny County Council | 24 | Castlecomer | | 6 |
| Kilkenny County Council | 24 | Kilkenny City | Kilkenny | 7 |
| Kilkenny County Council | 24 | Piltown | | 5 |
| Laois County Council | 19 | Borris-in-Ossory—Mountmellick | | 6 |
| Laois County Council | 19 | Graiguecullen—Portarlington | | 6 |
| Laois County Council | 19 | Portlaoise | | 7 |
| Leitrim County Council | 18 | Ballinamore | | 6 |
| Leitrim County Council | 18 | Carrick-on-Shannon | | 6 |
| Leitrim County Council | 18 | Manorhamilton | | 6 |
| Limerick City and County Council | 40 | Metropolitan District of Limerick City | Limerick City East | 7 |
| Limerick City and County Council | 40 | Metropolitan District of Limerick City | Limerick City North | 7 |
| Limerick City and County Council | 40 | Metropolitan District of Limerick City | Limerick City West | 7 |
| Limerick City and County Council | 40 | Adare—Rathkeale | | 6 |
| Limerick City and County Council | 40 | Cappamore—Kilmallock | | 7 |
| Limerick City and County Council | 40 | Newcastle West | | 6 |
| Longford County Council | 18 | Ballymahon | | 6 |
| Longford County Council | 18 | Granard | | 5 |
| Longford County Council | 18 | Longford | | 7 |
| Louth County Council | 29 | Ardee | | 6 |
| Louth County Council | 29 | Borough District of Drogheda | Drogheda Rural | 4 |
| Louth County Council | 29 | Borough District of Drogheda | Drogheda Urban | 6 |
| Louth County Council | 29 | Dundalk | Dundalk—Carlingford | 6 |
| Louth County Council | 29 | Dundalk | Dundalk South | 7 |
| Mayo County Council | 30 | Ballina | | 6 |
| Mayo County Council | 30 | Castlebar | | 7 |
| Mayo County Council | 30 | Claremorris | Claremorris | 6 |
| Mayo County Council | 30 | Claremorris | Swinford | 4 |
| Mayo County Council | 30 | Westport—Belmullet | Westport | 4 |
| Mayo County Council | 30 | Westport—Belmullet | Belmullet | 3 |
| Meath County Council | 40 | Ashbourne | | 6 |
| Meath County Council | 40 | Kells | | 7 |
| Meath County Council | 40 | Laytown—Bettystown | | 7 |
| Meath County Council | 40 | Navan | | 7 |
| Meath County Council | 40 | Ratoath | | 7 |
| Meath County Council | 40 | Trim | | 6 |
| Monaghan County Council | 18 | Ballybay—Clones | | 5 |
| Monaghan County Council | 18 | Carrickmacross—Castleblayney | | 6 |
| Monaghan County Council | 18 | Monaghan | | 7 |
| Offaly County Council | 19 | Birr | | 6 |
| Offaly County Council | 19 | Edenderry | | 6 |
| Offaly County Council | 19 | Tullamore | | 7 |
| Roscommon County Council | 18 | Athlone | | 6 |
| Roscommon County Council | 18 | Boyle | | 6 |
| Roscommon County Council | 18 | Roscommon | | 6 |
| Sligo County Council | 18 | Borough District of Sligo | Sligo—Strandhill | 6 |
| Sligo County Council | 18 | Ballymote—Tobercurry | | 7 |
| Sligo County Council | 18 | Sligo—Drumcliff | | 5 |
| South Dublin County Council | 40 | | Clondalkin | 7 |
| South Dublin County Council | 40 | | Firhouse—Bohernabreena | 5 |
| South Dublin County Council | 40 | | Lucan | 5 |
| South Dublin County Council | 40 | | Palmerstown—Fonthill | 5 |
| South Dublin County Council | 40 | | Rathfarnham—Templeogue | 7 |
| South Dublin County Council | 40 | | Tallaght Central | 6 |
| South Dublin County Council | 40 | | Tallaght South | 5 |
| Tipperary County Council | 40 | Borough District of Clonmel | Clonmel | 6 |
| Tipperary County Council | 40 | Cahir—Cashel | Cahir | 4 |
| Tipperary County Council | 40 | Cahir—Cashel | Cashel—Tipperary | 7 |
| Tipperary County Council | 40 | Carrick-on-Suir | | 5 |
| Tipperary County Council | 40 | Nenagh | Nenagh | 5 |
| Tipperary County Council | 40 | Nenagh | Newport | 4 |
| Tipperary County Council | 40 | Thurles | Thurles | 5 |
| Tipperary County Council | 40 | Thurles | Roscrea—Templemore | 4 |
| Waterford City and County Council | 32 | Metropolitan District of Waterford City | Tramore—Waterford City West | 6 |
| Waterford City and County Council | 32 | Metropolitan District of Waterford City | Waterford City East | 6 |
| Waterford City and County Council | 32 | Metropolitan District of Waterford City | Waterford City South | 6 |
| Waterford City and County Council | 32 | Comeragh | Portlaw—Kilmacthomas | 5 |
| Waterford City and County Council | 32 | Dungarvan—Lismore | Dungarvan | 6 |
| Waterford City and County Council | 32 | Dungarvan—Lismore | Lismore | 3 |
| Westmeath County Council | 20 | Athlone—Moate | Athlone | 5 |
| Westmeath County Council | 20 | Athlone—Moate | Moate | 4 |
| Westmeath County Council | 20 | Mullingar—Kinnegad | Mullingar | 6 |
| Westmeath County Council | 20 | Mullingar—Kinnegad | Kinnegad | 5 |
| Wexford County Council | 34 | Enniscorthy | | 6 |
| Wexford County Council | 34 | Gorey—Kilmuckridge | Gorey | 6 |
| Wexford County Council | 34 | Gorey—Kilmuckridge | Kilmuckridge | 4 |
| Wexford County Council | 34 | New Ross | | 6 |
| Wexford County Council | 34 | Rosslare | | 5 |
| Wexford County Council | 34 | Borough District of Wexford | Wexford | 7 |
| Wicklow County Council | 32 | Arklow | | 6 |
| Wicklow County Council | 32 | Baltinglass | | 6 |
| Wicklow County Council | 32 | Bray | Bray East | 4 |
| Wicklow County Council | 32 | Bray | Bray West | 4 |
| Wicklow County Council | 32 | Greystones | | 6 |
| Wicklow County Council | 32 | Wicklow | | 6 |

== See also ==
- Counties of Ireland
- Dáil constituencies
