= Heinrich-Heine-Preis des Ministeriums für Kultur der DDR =

German literary award

The Heinrich Heine Prize of the Ministry of Culture of the GDR was founded on February 17, 1956 and awarded once a year on December 13, Heine's birthday, for lyrical works and works of literary journalism . The price since 1979 was 10,000 and later 15,000 marks . 1989 the prize was not awarded, but in 1990 for both years. The Ministry of Culture existed until October 1990.

== Award winners ==
- 1957: Karl Schnog, Walther Victor
- 1958: Max Zimmering, Bruno Kaiser
- 1959: Walter Stranka, Wieland Herzfelde
- 1960: Lothar Kusche, Gerd Semmer
- 1961: Armin Müller, Peter Edel
- 1962: Hermann Kant, Paul Wiens
- 1963: Heinz Kahlau, Vladimir Pozner
- 1964: Günther Deicke, Hugo Huppert
- 1965: Walter Werner, Heinz Knobloch
- 1966: Helmut Preißler, Bruno Frei
- 1967: Jens Gerlach, Günther Cwojdrak
- 1968: Inge von Wangenheim, Uwe Berger
- 1969: Helmut Hauptmann, Jo Schulz
- 1970: Manfred Streubel, Rolf Recknagel
- 1971: Volker Braun, Werner Neubert
- 1972: Stephan Hermlin, Hans Kaufmann
- 1973: Sarah Kirsch, Gerhard Holtz-Baumert
- 1974: Kito Lorenc, Richard Christ
- 1975: Eva Strittmatter, Jean Villain
- 1976: Dieter Süverkrüp, Heinz Czechowski
- 1977: Gisela Steineckert, Jan Koplowitz
- 1978: Egon Richter
- 1979: Jürgen Rennert
- 1980: Rudolf Hirsch
- 1981: Renate Holland-Moritz
- 1982: John Erpenbeck
- 1983: Daniil Granin
- 1984: Bernt Engelmann
- 1985: Peter Gosse
- 1986: Landolf Scherzer
- 1987: Manfred Jendryschik
- 1988: Peter Rühmkorf
- 1989/90: Steffen Mensching, Hans-Eckardt Wenzel
