= Aberle =

Aberle is a surname. Notable people with the surname include:

- Anton Aberle (1876–1953), German-Swiss architect
- Armin Aberle (born 1960), Australian-German scientist
- David Aberle (1918–2004), American anthropologist
- Elke Aberle (born 1950), German actress
- eden ahbez (born George Alexander Aberle; 1908–1995), American songwriter
- Helmuth Aberle (born 1969), Austrian footballer
- Juan Aberle (1846–1930), Italian conductor and composer
- Karl Aberle (1901–1963), German publisher and politician
- Moritz von Aberle (1819–1875), German Catholic theologian
- Sophie Bledsoe Aberle (1896–1996), American anthropologist, physician and nutritionist
