= Bruno Kaiser =

German Marxist scholar

- Born: 5 February 1911; Berlin, German Empire
- Died: 27 January 1982 (aged 70); East Berlin, East Germany
- Occupations: Germanist; Journalist; Librarian
- Political party: SED
- Spouse: Stanislawa ("Stascha") Lewinson/Kaiser

Bruno Kaiser (5 February 1911 – 27 January 1982) was a Marxist scholar of German studies who became a journalist and, during the Nazi period, a resistance activist. In his later years he became, in addition, a distinguished librarian.

== Life ==
=== Early years ===
Bruno Kaiser was the son of a high school teacher who was also a passionate collector of, among other things, antique prints. In addition to his school education, Bruno Kaiser learned from his father a knowledge of collecting and a love of literature and of collecting that formed the basis for much of his later life. Following the successful completion of his school career he went on to Berlin's Humboldt University where he studied Literary sciences and Art history. He also started contributing to the venerable Vossische Zeitung (newspaper), initially on a voluntary basis and later as a contributing editor. Kaiser's period of study at the university was later terminated before completion and at some point he became an Antifascist activist. On 10 May 1932 Kaiser was one of a number of intellectuals showing public solidarity with the anti-war anti-Fascist campaigner Carl von Ossietzky, attempting to accompany the condemned man all the way to the prison door after the failure of his appeal hearing.

In January 1933 the NSDAP (Nazi Party) took power in Germany and early in 1934 the Vossische Zeitung was closed down which left Bruno Kaiser without a job. Under the new regime his record of anti-Fascist campaigning and his Jewish family background restricted his job opportunities in journalism, and he was already suffering from tuberculosis, but he continued working against Fascism, distributing illegal leaflets with anti-Fascist content. In 1938 he was arrested, interrogated and tortured, but no charges were preferred against him and he was released, albeit now under police surveillance. Still in 1938, he now took the first opportunity to emigrate, initially to Belgium.

Bruno Kaiser's published output (not necessarily a complete list)

- Der Maler Disteli und die Flüchtlinge. Der Deutsche Michel von 183 und die Entdeckung eines Porträts im Jahr 1944, Ähren-Verlag, Affoltern a. A. 1944–1945; dass., Reprint mit einem Kommentar von Werner Mittenzwei und einer Dokumentation von Markus Bürgi sowie einer analytischen Bibliographie von Barbara Voigt. Zentralantiquariat der DDR, Leipzig 1987 (Über die Grenzen 3).
- Die Schicksale der Bibliothek Georg Herweghs. Stadtgemeinde, Liestal 1945
- Friedrich Engels 1820–1895. Schweizerisches Sozial Archiv, Zürich 1945
- Über Beziehungen der deutschen und russischen Literatur im 19. Jahrhundert. Verlag Kultur und Fortschritt, Berlin 1948
- Unbekannte Dokumente von Marx und Engels. Neuentdeckungen zum Leben und Werk der Begründer des wissenschaftlichen Sozialismus. In: Neues Deutschland. (B) vom 9. Juli 1952
- Aus der Bibliothek von Karl Marx. Ein Bericht über wiedergefundene Schätze. In: Neues Deutschland, Nr. 104 (B) vom 5. Mai 1953
- Ernst Toller: Ausgewählte Schriften. Geleitwort von Bodo Uhse und Bruno Kaiser. Hrsg. von der Deutschen. Akademie der Künste zu Berlin. Volk und Welt, Berlin 1959
- Horst Kunze zum 50. Geburtstag. Berlin 1959
- Eine unbekannte Jugendarbeit von Friedrich Engels. (Über „Modernes Literaturleben“.) In: Beiträge zur Geschichte der Deutschen Arbeiterbewegung. Berlin 1960, Heft 1, S. 97–122
- Johann Hermann Detmold: Taten und Meinungen des Herrn Piepmeyer ... Mit Zeichnungen von Adolf Schrödter. Mit einem Nachwort von Bruno Kaiser. Buchverlag Der Morgen, Berlin 1961
- Jenny Marx als Theaterkritikerin. Zu einer bedeutsamen Wiederentdeckung. In: Beiträge zur Geschichte der Arbeiterbewegung. Berlin 1966, Heft 6, S. 1031–1042
- Information über das Schicksal der persönlichen Bücher von Karl Marx und Friedrich Engels. In: Theorie und Praxis. 9 (12.) Jg., Berlin 1963, Sonderheft S. 46 f.
- Schöne Kinderbücher aus der DDR. Mit einer Einführung von Bruno Kaiser. Bibliographische Angaben von Heinz Wegehaupt. Kinderbuchverlagm Berlin 1965
- Klaus Bulling: Bibliographie zur Fruchtbringenden Gesellschaft. Vorrede von Bruno Kaiser. Aufbau-Verlag, Berlin 1965
- Die Bücher von Maitland Park. In: Einheit. Zeitschrift für Theorie und Praxis des Wissenschaftlichen Sozialismus hrsg. vom Zentralkomitee der Sozialistischen Einheitspartei Deutschlands. – Berlin 1968, Bd. 23.1968, 4/5, S. 604–605
- Die Bibliothek des Instituts für Marxismus-Leninismus beim Zentralkomitee der SED. Ein Sammelband. Institut für Marxismus-Leninismus, Berlin 1969
- Bruno Kaiser / Inge Werchan: Ex Libris Marx und Engels. Das Schicksal der Bibliothek von Marx und Engels. Dietz Verlag, Berlin 1967
- Alfred Meißner: Heinrich Heine. Erinnerungen. 2. unveränd. Aufl. Hoffmann u. Campe, Hamburg 1856. (Unveränd. Fotomechan. Nachdr. mit einem Nachwort von Bruno Kaiser. Zentralantiquariat d. DDR), Leipzig 1972
- Bücher ohne Titel oder die Schwarte auf der Karte. Edition Leipzig, Leipzig 1975
- Karl Marx im Bonner Bundestag. Eine Information über überraschende Ergebnisse neuer Forschungsarbeiten. In: Beiträge zur Marx-Engels-Forschung. Dem Wirken Auguste Cornus gewidmet. In: Sitzungsberichte der Akademie der Wissenschaften der DDR. 20. Akademie Verlag, Berlin 1973, S. 29–31
- Thomas Schleusing: Es war einmal ... Märchen für Erwachsene. Mit einem Nachwort von Bruno Kaiser. Eulenspiegel-Verlag, Berlin 1979
- Vom glückhaften Finden. Essays, Berichte, Feuilletons. Aufbau Verlag, Berlin / Weimar 1981

=== Exile ===
Kaiser used his exile to study in libraries in Belgium, the Netherlands and France, making a speciality of unearthing and rediscovering long forgotten publications from classical writers whose better remembered works inspired Workers' movements in the twentieth century, notably Friedrich Engels. Despite the restrictions imposed by exile, his life was intricately bound up with literature and with progressive thinking, even where his sources dated back a hundred years or more. For Europe the Second World War was broke out in September 1939 and in May 1940 the fighting moved west with the German invasion of Belgium. Kaiser was interned in Belgium and then moved under detention to France where he was held in several locations, ending up in the Gurs internment camp in the south of the country. Here he suffered a recurrence of his tuberculosis.

Communists in Marseille now arranged for Bruno Kaiser to be transferred to Switzerland for medical treatment, where he was re-interned in the canton of Baselland. In Liestal, the cantonal capital, he was permitted to catalogue and sort the large volume of papers left by Georg and Emma Herwegh which had been gifted to the municipality by the couple's son, Marcel Herwegh. In 1946, shortly after the war, with the help of Kaiser's work on inventorizing the archive, the municipality was able to open the Liestal Poets and Town Museum, its ground floor devoted to the Herweghs and their literary output.

In 1943 Kaiser also joined the Swiss branch of the (increasingly Soviet sponsored) Free Germany Movement (BFD / Bewegung Freies Deutschland).

=== Marxist librarian ===
In the summer of 1947, after a period in Belgium, Bruno Kaiser, with his wife Stascha, returned to Berlin which by now was in the Soviet occupation zone (SBZ / Sowjetische Besatzungszone) of what remained of Germany. He became a Departmental Director at the Berlin State Library where between 1947 and 1949 he concentrated on sorting out and preserving book collections confiscated by the Nazis in 1933 from Workers' Movement libraries. His own book collection, acquired during his youth and subsequent exile, already made him one of the most important bibliophile/book collectors in what was becoming the German Democratic Republic (formally founded in 1949 from what till then had been the SBZ). During this time he was living at an address in the "vor Schönholz Street" ("Straße vor Schönholz") which after 1953, together with the adjacent "Beatrice Zweig Street" ("Beatrice-Zweig-Straße"), would comprise the Berlin's officially designated "Erich Weinert Quarter" ("Erich-Weinert-Siedlung"), known within East Germany as the home of the literary scholars, artists and other intelligentsia favoured by the authorities. Around this time he also received his doctorate.

In May 1948 Kaiser became a member of the country's ruling Socialist Unity Party of Germany (SED / Sozialistische Einheitspartei Deutschlands) which had been formed two years earlier in the Soviet administered zone of Germany through a controversial merger of the Communist Party with the more moderately left-wing SPD (party).

Also in 1948 Kaiser visited Moscow in order to undertake research work at the city's Institute for Marxism–Leninism. He was able to set up meetings leading to various agreements for future cooperation and literary exchanges. The most visible agreement involved the creation of an equivalent Institute for Marxism–Leninism in the German Democratic Republic, and this was duly founded in Berlin by The Party in March 1949, a party-political teaching institution with its own research department and a major political-academic library at its heart. Kaiser was put in charge of creating and managing the Berlin institute, which now became his life's work, and a responsibility that closely matched his interest, abilities and experience. In October 1949 he was appointed the institute's first librarian. Building the library from nothing, and with necessarily restricted funding, involved a large amount of book collecting, for which he had already demonstrated his talents, and Kaiser also undertook extensive international networking with institutional heads in other countries.

In 1950 he set up the International Bibliography of Marxist Periodicals. In the same year a photo-laboratory and bookbinding department were added. Another particular achievement by Kaiser was the location and acquisition of the greater part of the reference libraries of Karl Marx und Friedrich Engels. During his more than two decades Kaiser also published numerous articles and books and built up a substantial reputation in the field of Marxist–Leninist scholarship. Additionally, in 1961 he received a professorship.

=== Retirement and death ===
In 1972 Bruno Kaiser retired from The Institute that he had created. On 27 January 1982 he died, slightly more than a week before his 72nd birthday. His remains were placed with others of the country's elite in the Friedrichsfelde Main Cemetery. His own library and literary archive went to the Berlin State Library.

== Awards and honours ==
- 1958: Heinrich Heine prize from the Culture Ministry
- 1958: Medal for Fighters Against Fascism 1933–1945
- 1969: Patriotic Order of Merit in bronze
- 1971: National Prize of East Germany
- 1976: Patriotic Order of Merit in silver
- 1981: Honorary Doctorate from the Humboldt University of Berlin
- 1981: Patriotic Order of Merit in gold
