= Heinrich Heine Prize =

Three different awards named in honour of Christian Johann Heinrich Heine

Heinrich Heine Prize refers to three different awards named in honour of the 19th-century German poet Christian Johann Heinrich Heine:

- Heinrich Heine prize of Düsseldorf
- Heinrich Heine prize of the Ministry for Culture of the former GDR, which was assigned until 1990
- Heinrich Heine Prize of the "Heinrich-Heine-Gesellschaft" in Hamburg

== Heinrich Heine prize of the city of Düsseldorf ==
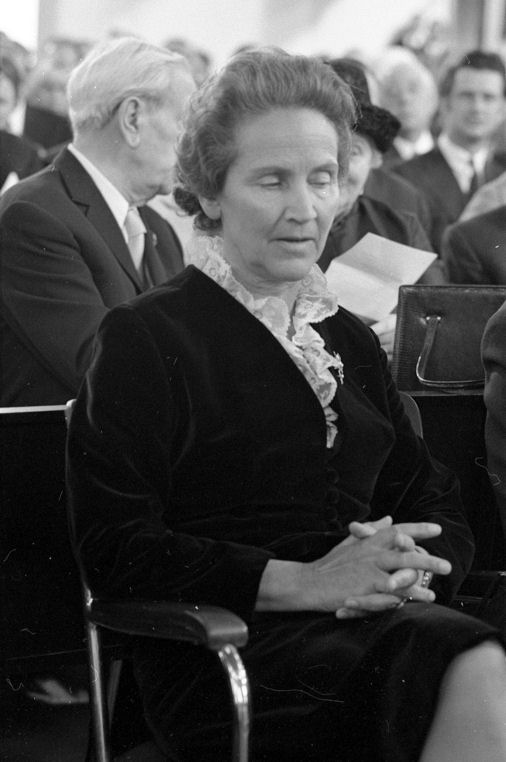
Marion Gräfin Dönhoff

The Heinrich Heine prize of the city of Düsseldorf was established on the occasion of Heine's 175th birthday. The honor is awarded to personalities who through their work in the spirit of Heine's emphasis on the basic rights of man, advance social and political progress, mutual understanding of the peoples, or spread the idea that all people belong to the same group: mankind. Beginning in 1972, the Heine prize was awarded every three years; since 1981 it was awarded every two years. The assignment of the Heine prize 1995 was shifted to the year 1996. Since that time the Heine prize is again awarded every two years. It is endowed with €25,000; starting from the year 2006, the 150th after the death of the poet, the city of Düsseldorf has doubled the prize sum to €50,000.

=== Recipients ===
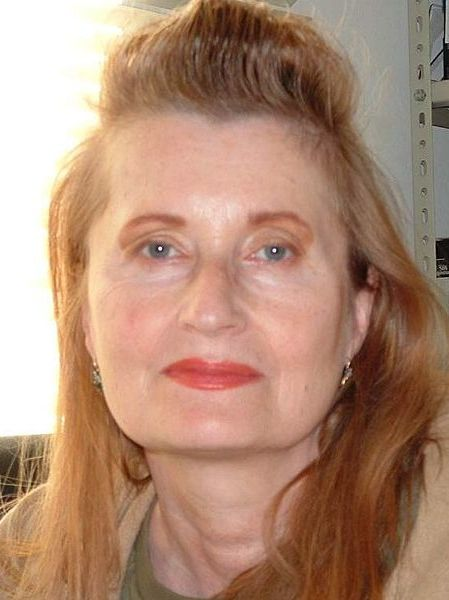
Elfriede Jelinek

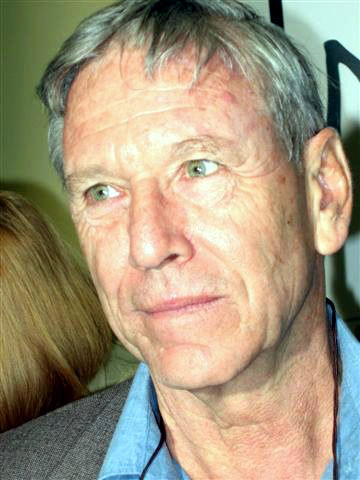
Amos Oz

- 1972 Carl Zuckmayer
- 1974 Kito Lorenc
- 1975 Pierre Bertaux
- 1978 Sebastian Haffner
- 1981 Walter Jens
- 1983 Carl Friedrich von Weizsäcker
- 1985 Günter Kunert
- 1987 Marion Gräfin Dönhoff
- 1989 Max Frisch
- 1991 Richard von Weizsäcker
- 1993 Wolf Biermann
- 1996 Władysław Bartoszewski
- 1998 Hans Magnus Enzensberger
- 2000 W. G. Sebald
- 2002 Elfriede Jelinek
- 2004 Robert Gernhardt
- 2006 not awarded
- 2008 Amos Oz
- 2010 Simone Veil
- 2012 Jürgen Habermas
- 2014 Alexander Kluge
- 2016 A. L. Kennedy
- 2018 Leoluca Orlando
- 2021 Rachel Salamander
- 2022 Yurii Andrukhovych
- 2024 David Grossman

=== Controversy concerning Peter Handke ===
The jury that decided the prize consisted of 5 members of the city government, 1 representative of the state of North Rhine-Westphalia, the rector of the Heinrich Heine University, and 5 other members (critics and literary experts). The 5 members from the city government have 1 vote each, the others 2 votes each.

On 20 May 2006, the jury voted 12:5 to award the prize to Peter Handke (the state representative was not present). The mayor congratulated Handke, and Handke accepted the award. According to press reports, a majority of the city council of Düsseldorf did not want to award the prize to Handke, arguing that his (perceived) support of Slobodan Milošević's oppressive regime was in blatant conflict with the spirit of the prize. According to the statutes of the Heine prize, "the city council awards the prize based on the decision of the jury". On 2 June 2006, jury members Siegrid Löffler and Jean-Pierre Lefèbvre declared to leave the jury in protest.

In a letter to Düsseldorf's Mayor Joachim Erwin dated 2 June 2006, Mr Handke refused the award, as he did not want himself and his work to be "exposed again and again to the scorn of party politicians". In a reply of 7 June 2006, Mr Erwin expressed his solidarity with Handke.

== Heinrich Heine Prize of the Heinrich-Heine-Gesellschaft ==
Since 1965, the Heinrich-Heine-Gesellschaft ("Heine Society") of Hamburg has presented a literary prize at irregular intervals. It consists of a bronze object "Die Schere der Zensur" ("the scissors of censorship") made by sculptor Bert Gerresheim.

=== Recipients ===
- 1965 Max Brod
- 1972 Hilde Domin
- 1976 Marcel Reich-Ranicki
- 1981 Martin Walser
- 1984 Peter Rühmkorf
- 1989 Kay und Lore Lorentz
- 1992 Sarah Kirsch
- 1994 Tankred Dorst
- 1997 Ruth Klüger
- 2000 Bernhard Schlink
- 2003 Dieter Forte
- 2006 Alice Schwarzer
- 2009 Herta Müller
- 2012 Dževad Karahasan

== Heinrich Heine prize of the Ministry for culture of the GDR ==
The Heinrich Heine prize of the Ministry for culture of the GDR 1950 donated and once annually awarded for lyric works and works of literary journalism. The height of the prize amounted to 15,000 Marks.

=== Recipients ===
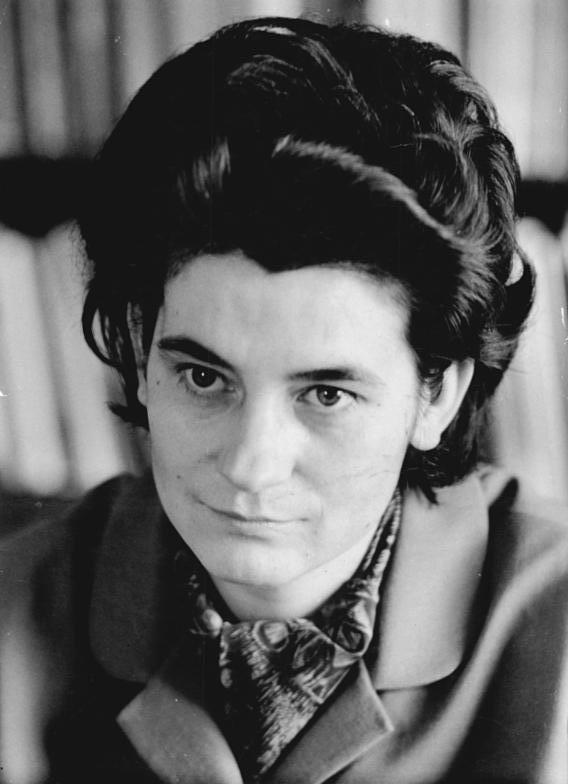
Christa Wolf

- 1953 Stefan Heym
- 1957 Herbert Nachbar
- 1959 Heiner Müller, Wieland Herzfelde
- 1960 Gerd Semmer
- 1961 Armin Müller
- 1962 Hermann Kant
- 1963 Heinz Kahlau
- 1964 Christa Wolf, Hugo Huppert
- 1965 Heinz Knobloch
- 1970 Rolf Recknagel
- 1971 Volker Braun
- 1972 Stephan Hermlin, Hans Kaufmann
- 1973 Sarah Kirsch, Ulrich Plenzdorf
- 1974 Kito Lorenc
- 1975 Irmtraud Morgner, Eva Strittmatter
- 1976 Dieter Süverkrüp
- 1977 Heinz Czechowski
- 1978 Egon Richter
- 1979 Jürgen Rennert
- 1984 Bernt Engelmann (?), John Erpenbeck
- 1985 Peter Gosse
- 1987 Luise Rinser
- 1988 Peter Rühmkorf
- 1990 Hans-Eckardt Wenzel

== See also ==
- German literature
- List of literary awards
- List of poetry awards
- List of years in literature
- List of years in poetry
