= German Democratic Legion =

- Deutsche Demokratische Legion
- Active: March-April 1848
- Country: Germany
- Allegiance: German Revolution
- Branch: Baden Revolutionaries
- Type: Legion
- Size: c. 1,000
- Engagements: Hecker uprising: Battle of Dossenbach

Commanders
- Notable commanders: Adelbert von Bornstedt; Georg Herwegh

The German Democratic Legion was a volunteer unit formed by exiled German craftsmen and other emigrants in Paris under the leadership of the socialist poet Georg Herwegh, which set out for the Grand Duchy of Baden at the beginning of the German Revolution of 1848 to support the radical democratic Hecker uprising against the Baden government. A week after the military defeat of the uprising, the German Democratic Legion was also defeated and wiped out by Württemberg troops on April 27, 1848 in the battle of Dossenbach.

== Formation ==
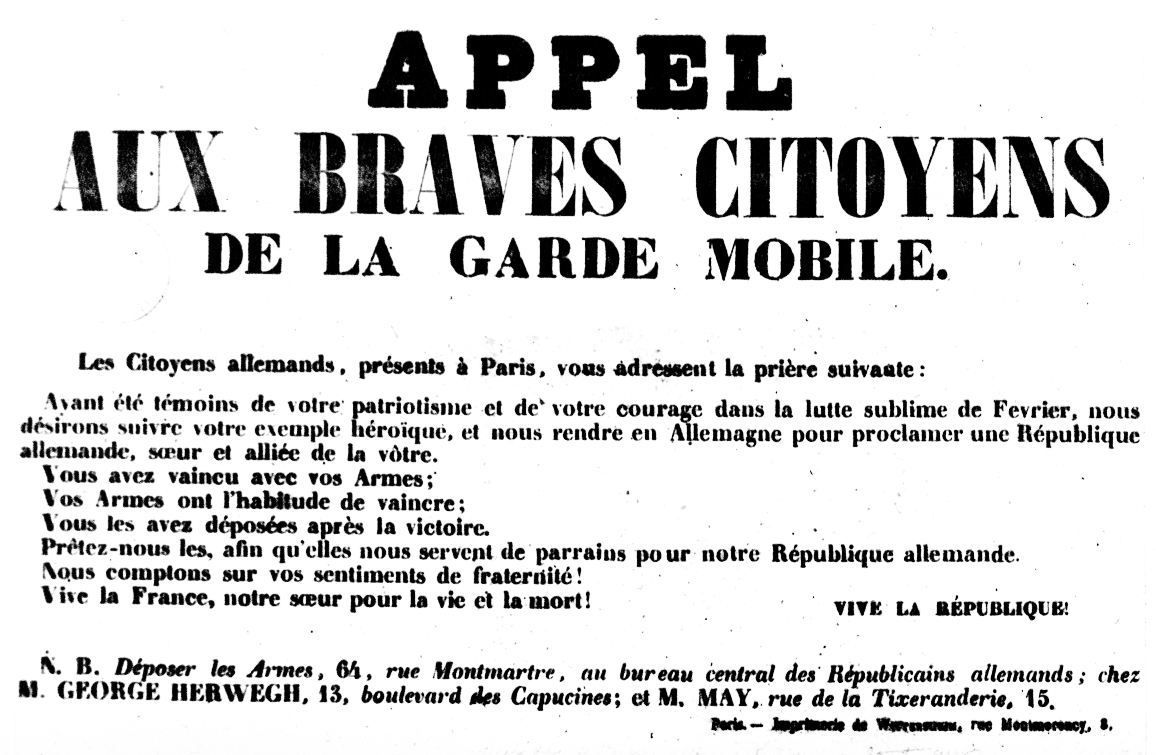
"Call of the German Democratic Society to the brave citizens of the Guard mobile in Paris to lend their no longer needed weapons to fight for a German republic. Please hand it in at the Central Office of the German Republicans at George Herwegh's".

Adelbert von Bornstedt, a former Prussian political refugee in Paris and editor of a German-language newspaper, had founded a “German Democratic Society”, whose president was the Swabian poet Georg Herwegh. This association decided to set up a corps of volunteers to support the revolution in the German states. It was intended in particular to help the republican insurrection of Friedrich Hecker and Gustav Struve in Germany before coming to the aid of the Poles.

The Legion benefited from the networks of German expatriates brought together by the publication in 1843 of La Correspondance française written by the Bôrnstein brothers in an apartment on the first floor of a corner building, rue des Petits-Champs. In the same offices, the two brothers created a few months later, in January 1844, the cultural and political bi-weekly Vorwärts. In 1844, according to the publications of the two brothers, there were 80,000 Germans in Paris, many of them in the Rue Montorgueil district and a large number of craftsmen and workers.

In a note communicated to the press, the promoters of the recruitment assessed their strengths at the national level: 1,000 German Democrats from Metz, Colmar, Nancy and Basel; a legion of 5,000 men, formed in Biel, under the command of citizens Schuller and Doffner, both aides-de-camp to General Ochsenbein, the Paris legion of 2,000 men, plus the legions of Lyon, Marseille, Bordeaux and a total of 12,000 combatants, whom they hoped to unite before long on the banks of the Rhine.

The company is comparable to that of the Belgian Legion. Supported by Napoléon Joseph Ney and Mikhail Bakunin but strongly criticized by Karl Marx and Friedrich Engels, it benefited from the help of the French provisional government of Alphonse de Lamartine, who wanted in the process to get rid of a potential source of disorder.

In the chambers of deputies in Europe, the creation of this legion provoked heated debates. Heinrich von Gagern informed the Second Chamber of States of Hesse of the republican intentions of the German columns, calling for a vote of confidence, "in order to resist a system of violence which would aim to impose by force a new order of things". He reproached France for allowing gatherings which could compromise international relations, and he announced the steps taken by the ambassadors of the German powers to Lamartine. The Abgeordnetenhaus of Berlin, on April 4, applauded the passage of a speech by M. Devinck, who spoke energetically against "the expedition of Germans who came from France to demoralize Germany". The legionaries above all want to reach out to German public opinion: “Brothers, in our beautiful country, welcome the exiles who approach as friends, because we never intended to return to our native soil as enemies. Far be it from us to impose your freedom, to limit your will or to attack your property”, affirmed a proclamation signed, on behalf of the legion, by Georg Herwegh and Heinrich Börnstein.

The Parisian part of the Legion comprised approximately 800 to 1,000 men, divided into four battalions and benefiting from the voluntary supervision of former Prussian officers such as Otto von Corvin-Wiersbitzki and Wilhelm von Loewenfels. The call of the "German Democratic Society" to the citizens of the mobile guard in Paris, via placards and banners, to hand over their weapons was not however heard and the legionaries found themselves without many weapons: only 250 rifles and 50 pistols. Led by a committee of seven people, they took the road to Strasbourg on foot, hoping to recover some in their path.

== Expedition ==
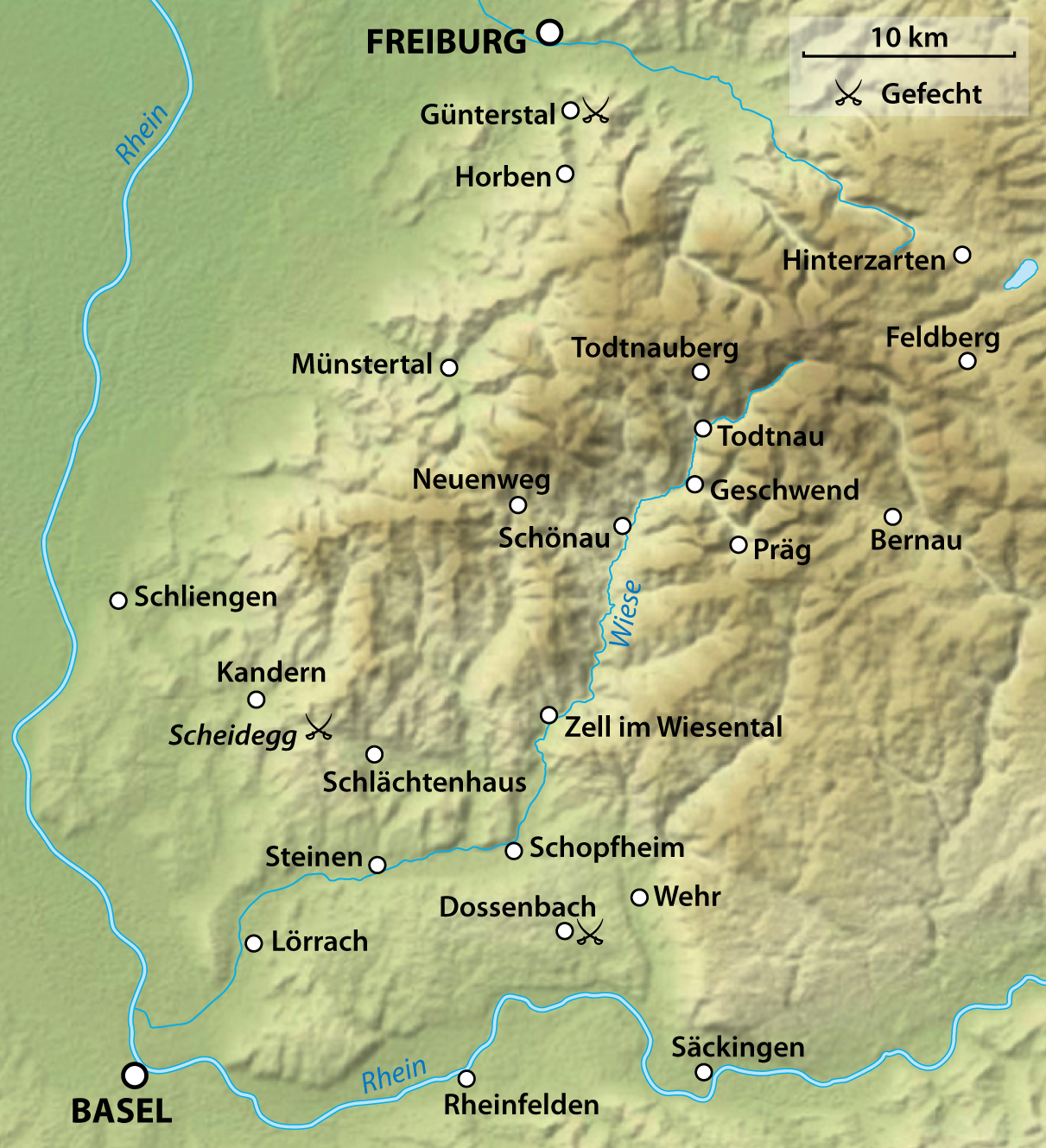
Map of the area affected by the uprising with marking of the battle of Dossenbach.

On March 24, 1848, they marched in Strasbourg, where reports showed the caution of the German troops. Before the Hecker uprising began, Herwegh and others contacted Joseph Fickler and offered the Legion's support for a republican uprising in Baden. Emma Sigmund (1817-1904), the daughter of a wealthy Jewish clothier from Berlin and wife of Herwegh, scouted ahead to Baden to negotiate with leaders of the Baden uprising. But Friedrich Hecker showed little enthusiasm for the addition, although he promised to inform when and where the Legion should unite with its supporters. Herwegh and the legionaries waited in vain for this news. Another meeting followed later, which was now called a meeting point. The government in Paris also urged the troops to act because they wanted to get rid of the revolutionary elements.

The Legion crossed the Rhine at Kembs, on the night of April 23-24, then went to Kandern. From there, after a short rest, it moved to Wieden. When the German Legion entered there on the 25th after a tiring march, it learned that Sigel had already withdrawn and that Freiburg was in the possession of the princely troops. The legionaries soon realized that they would have to fend for themselves and had no chance of victory and some tried to flee to Switzerland. After several days, on April 27, 1848, the Legion met in Schopfheim with troops from the Württemberg army, the 6th infantry regiment, commanded by Friedrich von Lipp. At Dossenbach, the regular troops defeated the Legion despite their numerical superiority, killing 30 legionaries while 300 more were captured, among them their leader Adelbert von Bornstedt, who was sentenced to one year solitary confinement for high treason in 1849. Georg Herwegh was able to escape with his wife to Switzerland, an episode that sparked many caricatures and satirical songs about his supposed hasty escape. Emma Herwegh took the pen to write a "History of the Legion of German Democrats in Paris", signed "a woman guilty of high treason", for the ex-legionaries, a good part of which then fed German emigration to America, like Heinrich Börnstein and Karl Börnstein.

== Bibliography ==
- Angelow, Jürgen (1996). Von Wien nach Königgrätz. Die Sicherheitspolitik des deutschen Bundes im europäischen Gleichgewicht 1815-1866 (in German). Göttingen. ISBN 978-3-486-56143-2.
- Börnstein, Heinrich (1884) [1881]. Fünfundsiebzig Jahre in der Alten und Neuen Welt. Memoiren eines Unbedeutenden (in German) (2 ed.). Leipzig: Otto Wigand. pp. 402–411.
- Herwegh, Emma (1849). Zur Geschichte der deutschen demokratischen Legion aus Paris (in German). Grünberg.
- Ruttmann, Ulrike (2001). Wunschbild – Schreckbild – Trugbild. Rezeption und Instrumentalisierung Frankreichs in der deutschen Revolution von 1848/49 (in German). Stuttgart. p. 104. ISBN 978-3-515-07886-3.
- Struve, Gustav (1849). Geschichte der drei Volkserhebungen in Baden (in German). Bern: Jenni Stadt. OCLC 839906091.
- von Lip, Friedrich (1850). Georg Herwegh's viertägige Irr- und Wanderfahrt mit der Pariser deutsch-demokratischen Legion in Deutschland und deren Ende durch die Württemberger bei Dossenbach (in German). Stuttgart.
