= Peter Blanker =

Dutch singer (born 1939)

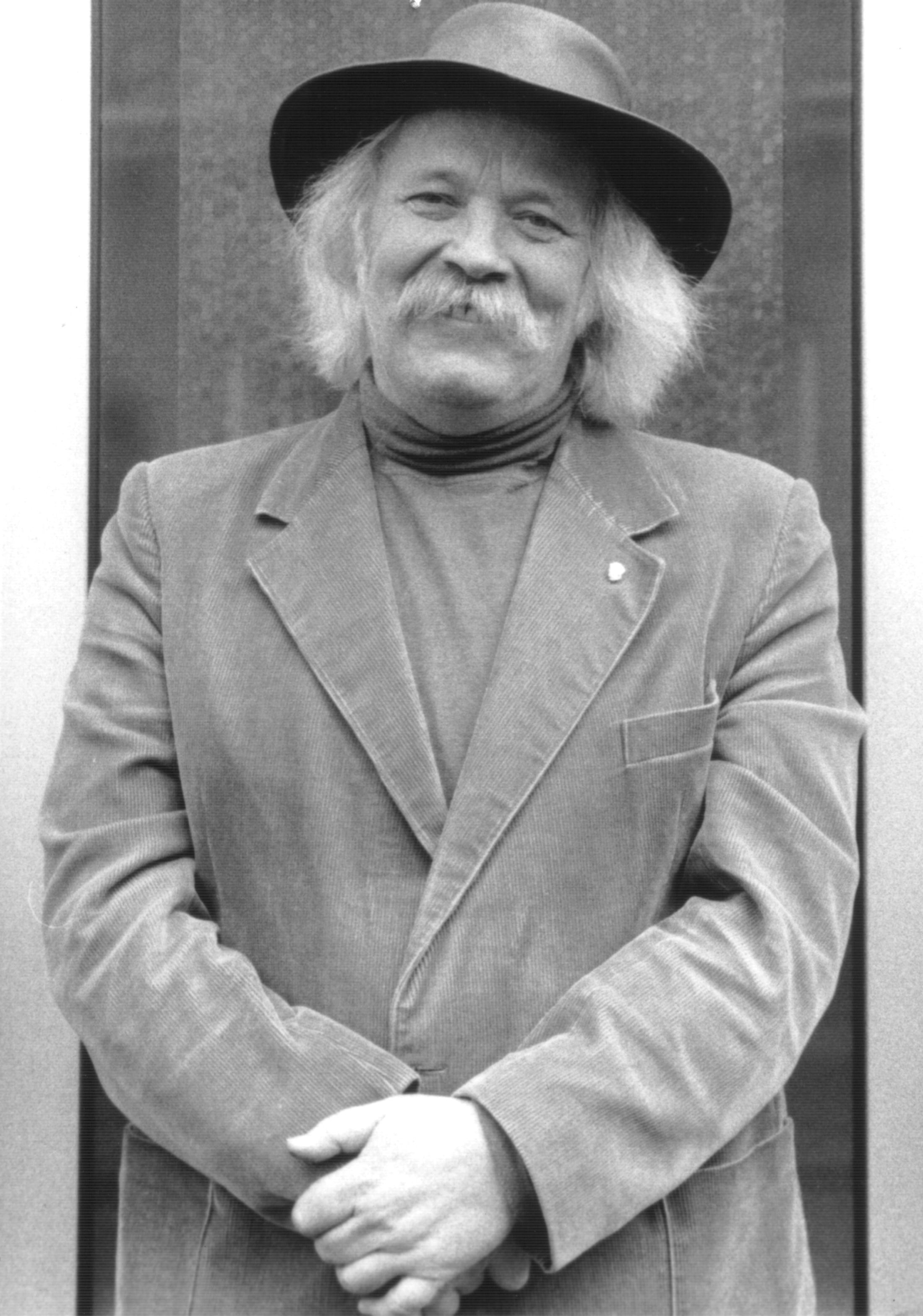
Blanker in 2002

Peter Blanker (born 11 June 1939 in Delfshaven) is a Dutch singer and musical artist. Blanker sings and writes in the Levenslied genre, a somewhat sentimental popular genre, and teaches the writing of such songs. Many of his songs dealt with his birthplace (Delfshaven) and his later domicile (Rotterdam). He scored a minor hit in 1981 with a translation of a Mac Davis song, and for eleven years had a radio show dedicated to the Levenslied.

== Biography ==
Blanker began a career as a singer in 1961, after working as a sailor, grape picker, and journalist. He was inspired by the French chansonnier Georges Brassens and his Dutch counterpart Jules de Corte.

In the 1960s Blanker worked in Cabaret, and from 1975 to 1978 acted and sang in the children's television show De Holle Bolle Boom, which aired on AVRO television, working with Leontien Ceulemans, Hans Otjes, and Maria Lindes, under the musical direction of Tonny Eyk. Another television show he performed in was 't Oproer kraait, in which he sang the Boris Vian song "Le Déserteur", a song about a conscientious objector; censorship by the record company is blamed for the song not being included in a compilation of the show.

Many of his own songs celebrated Delfshaven and Rotterdam. He scored an unexpected hit in 1981 with the song "'t Is moeilijk bescheiden te blijven", a translation of Mac Davis's "It's Hard to Be Humble", and became so tired of it that he refused to sing it, or any other cover. In 1987 he released the single "Alles heeft een einde (maar een worst wel twee)", a Peter Koelewijn translation of the German song "Alles hat ein Ende nur die Wurst hat zwei" ("Everything has an end, but a sausage has two") by Stephan Remmler.

He wrote and produced a number of songs for Kinderen voor Kinderen, and for eleven years did a radio show on the Levenslied for the KRO, Levenslief en levensleed. He also taught songwriting in the genre, teaching his students to be wary of cliches and to work toward a generalizing moral in (typically) the third stanza. In the early 1990s he directed a writer's collective which ended up producing a musical, Kaat Mossel. In 2003 his fortieth anniversary in show business was celebrated with a national tour, and in that same year he retired from performing; he moved to the Shetland Islands, where he led a sea shanty choir.

== Award ==
- The city of Rotterdam awarded Blanker in 2003 with the Wolfert van Borselen medal.
