= Manfred Kern =

Austrian footballer

Personal information
- Date of birth: 13 February 1964
- Place of birth: Vienna, Austria
- Height: 1.70 m (5 ft 7 in)
- Position: Midfielder

Youth career
- 1973–: Admira/Wacker

Senior career*
Years	Team	Apps	(Gls)
–1990	Admira/Wacker		
1990–1991	Rapid Wien	24	(3)
1991–1992	Austria Wien	25	(0)
1992–1993	FC Linz		
- SC Kriens
- 1. Wr. Neustädter SC
- LASK
- VSE St. Pölten

International career
1985–1988	Austria	3	(0)
- * Club domestic league appearances and goals

Manfred Kern (born 13 February 1964) is an Austrian former international footballer.
