= Le Déserteur (song) =

Anti-war song by Boris Vian

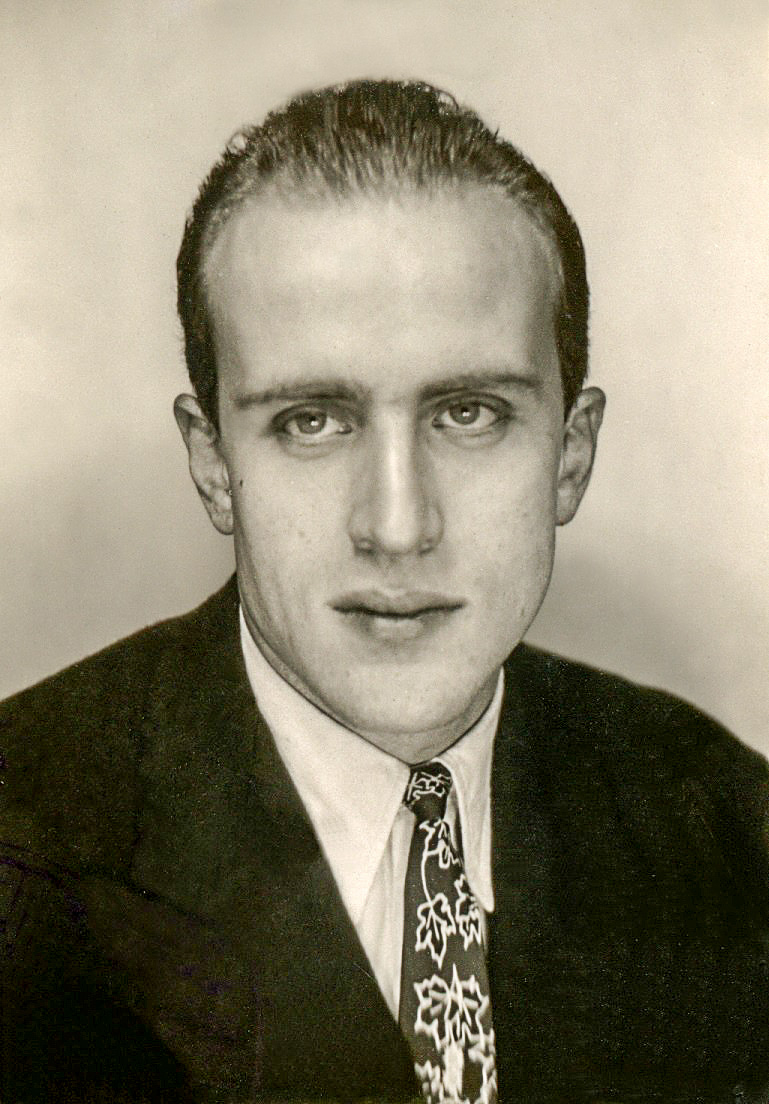
Writer and musician Boris Vian was a heavy critic of the French colonial wars of the 1950s. Due to the heavy criticism expressed in Le Déserteur, French radio stations were not allowed to play it.

"Le Déserteur" (French pronunciation: [lə dezɛʁtœʁ], The Deserter) is an anti-war song written by the French poet and musician Boris Vian. It was first performed on the day of the decisive French defeat in the First Indochina War on May 7, 1954. The song was sung by Marcel Mouloudji on that day in concert, and he recorded it a week later. However, its sale and broadcast were forbidden by the French national radio committee until 1962.

The first translation was in 1956 into Esperanto. It was later translated into German (1959 by Gerd Semmer), English (September 1964 by John Brunner), Italian (1966 by Santo Catanuto, Norwegian riksmål ("Herr president", 1966 by André Bjerke), 1971 by Giorgio Calabrese, sung by Luigi Tenco, Ornella Vanoni and Ivano Fossati), Swedish ("Desertören", 1969 by Roland Von Malmborg, "Jag står här på ett torg" before 2003 by Lars Forssell), Dutch ("De deserteur", 1964 by Ernst van Altena, sung by Peter Blanker), Polish ("Dezerter" by Wojciech Młynarski), Welsh ("Y FFoadur" by Huw Jones), Catalan (1977 sung by Ramon Muntaner and Joan Ollé, 1980 by Joan Isaac), Danish (1964 by Per Dich), Spanish (1986 by Glutamato Ye-yé, 2003 by Manuel Talens, later by José Manuel Caballero Bonald) and many other languages. The song was recorded in French by Peter, Paul & Mary in 1966 and by Esther & Abi Ofarim for their album 2 In 3 in 1967. "The Deserter" was one of four Vian songs translated into English and released as a 1983 EP by New Zealand musician Bill Direen, using the pseudonym "Feast of Frogs" (the other songs were "Snob", "I Drink", and "Hurt Me Johnny"). In the United States, Joan Baez sang it during the Vietnam War.

The song is in the form of a letter to the French president from a man explaining his reasons for refusing the call to arms and becoming a deserter: in it, he explains that he wants nothing to do with war as he has seen his father die, his brother leave never to return, his children cry and his mother dies of sorrow. He also explains that he does not want to "kill poor people", that he has lost everything he loved already and he would rather become a beggar and a peace activist, telling people not to obey, not to engage in war, and to refuse to leave when they are drafted. In the late 1970s, the song was covered by nuclear protesters in Brittany, as a direct apostrophe to the fierce pro-nuclear French president Giscard d'Estaing in the Plogoff struggle.

A stanza of the song appears in Thomas Pynchon's novel V. (1963). Several parts of the song were altered by Boris Vian at the request of and in collaboration with Marcel Mouloudji, who was the only singer willing to record it. The biggest change is in the last stanza. In the original version, the deserter has a weapon and intends to defend himself against the forces of law if they pursue him. In the version of Mouloudji (used by many subsequent artists) he promises to be unarmed and be ready to die if pursued. The following is the altered French stanza and its English translation:

Si vous me poursuivez,
Prévenez vos gendarmes
Que je n'aurai pas d'armes
Et qu'ils pourront tirer.

If you pursue me,
Warn your policemen,
That I won't be carrying a weapon,
and that they can shoot me.

The resulting version, in spite of its pacifist leaning, was banned from 1954 to 1962 from public broadcast.

== See also ==
- List of anti-war songs
