= 1990–91 Austrian Cup =

Tournament details
- Country: Austria

Final positions
- Champions: SV Stockerau
- Runners-up: Rapid Wien

The 1990–91 Austrian Cup (German: ÖFB-Cup) was the 57th season of Austria's nationwide football cup competition. The final was held at the Praterstadion, Vienna on 30 May 1991.

The competition was won by SV Stockerau after beating Rapid Wien 2–1.

== Second round ==
Team 1	Score	Team 2
14 August 1990
ASK Köflach	1–2 (a.e.t.)	SV Spittal/Drau
ASKÖ Steyrermühl	0–4	Donawitzer SV Alpine
Badener AC	0–0 (a.e.t.) (5–4 p)	SV Schwechat
FC Kufstein	2–0	SV Hall
SV Schattendorf	0–4	First Vienna FC
15 August 1990
1. SC Wiener Neustadt	2–8	SV Stockerau
1. SV Wiener Neudorf	2–1	Kremser SC
ASK Voitsberg	0–2	Linzer ASK
FC Puch	7–0	SK Mittersill
Favoritner AC	1–0	VfB Union Mödling
SV Flavia Solva	4–1	Amateure Steyr
ASK Nettingsdorf	2–1	Austria Tabak Linz
SC Eisenstadt	2–0	FC ÖMV Stadlau
SC Kundl	1–9	SV Austria Salzburg
SC Rheindorf Altach	5–5 (a.e.t.) (3–4 p)	FC Salzburg
SC Tulln	0–3	ASV Vösendorf
SC Untersiebenbrunn	0–0 (a.e.t.) (10–11 p)	SR Donaufeld
SC Zwettl	0–6	Wiener Sport-Club
SK Altheim	3–4	Grazer AK
Deutschlandsberger SC	2–1 (a.e.t.)	Wolfsberger AC
SV Feldbach	1–2	SK Sturm Graz
SV Feldkirchen	2–2 (a.e.t.) (2–4 p)	SK VÖEST Linz
SV Fügen	0–6	WSG Wattens
SV Gols	0–1	VSE St. Pölten
SV Sigleß	1–5	SK Rapid Wien
SV Wienerberger	0–7	Admira/Wacker
SVG Bleiburg	0–3	SK Vorwärts Steyr
Salzburger AK 1914	0–1	SK Austria Klagenfurt
Union Esternberg	4–4 (a.e.t.) (2–4 p)	LUV Graz
Viktoria/Floridsdorfer AC	1–5	FK Austria Wien
Villacher SV	2–0	SAK Klagenfurt
FC Wolfurt	1–8	FC Swarovski Tirol

== Third round ==
Team 1	Score	Team 2
4 September 1990
1. SV Wiener Neudorf	1–2	SR Donaufeld
SK Austria Klagenfurt	0–5	SK Sturm Graz
Badener AC	0–2	Admira/Wacker
FC Kufstein	2–4 (a.e.t.)	SV Austria Salzburg
FC Puch	1–4	FC Salzburg
Favoritner AC	3–0	First Vienna FC
SV Flavia Solva	1–4	SK VOEST Linz
LUV Graz	1–0	SV Spittal/Drau
Linzer ASK	3–2 (a.e.t.)	SK Vorwärts Steyr
ASK Nettingsdorf	1–1 (a.e.t.) (3–4 p)	ASV Vösendorf
Deutschlandsberger SC	1–1 (a.e.t.) (5–3 p)	Donawitzer SV Alpine
SV Stockerau	2–0	VSE St. Pölten
Villacher SV	1–2 (a.e.t.)	Grazer AK
WSG Wattens	1–5	FC Swarovski Tirol
Wiener Sport-Club	3–0	FK Austria Wien
5 September 1990
SC Eisenstadt	0–5	SK Rapid Wien

== Fourth round ==
Team 1	Score	Team 2
9 April 1991
ASV Vösendorf	1–3	FC Salzburg
FC Swarovski Tirol	2–3	SV Austria Salzburg
LUV Graz	1–0	Linzer ASK
SR Donaufeld	1–2	SK Sturm Graz
Deutschlandsberger SC	1–3	SK Rapid Wien
SV Stockerau	3–2	Admira/Wacker
Wiener Sport-Club	3–2 (a.e.t.)	Grazer AK
10 April 1991
Favoritner AC	1–2 (a.e.t.)	VOEST Linz

== Quarter-finals ==
Team 1	Score	Team 2
23 April 1991
FC Salzburg	1–5	SK Rapid Wien
LUV Graz	2–1	SK Sturm Graz
SV Stockerau	3–1	VOEST Linz
Wiener Sport-Club	1–0 (a.e.t.)	SV Austria Salzburg

== Semi-finals ==
Team 1	Score	Team 2
8 May 1991
LUV Graz	0–1	SK Rapid Wien
SV Stockerau	1–0	Wiener Sport-Club

== Final ==
30 May 1991
14:30

SK Rapid Wien	1–2	SV Stockerau
Reiter 8'	Report	Wenzel 30'; Pospisil 52'

Praterstadion, Vienna
Attendance: 12,000
Referee: Gerhard Kapl
