= Joachim Moitzi =

Austrian footballer

Personal information
- Date of birth: 20 May 1969 (age 57)
- Place of birth: Austria
- Position: Forward

Senior career*
Years	Team	Apps	(Gls)
–1990	Casino Salzburg	4	(0)
1990–1992	Rapid Wien	11	(1)
1992–1993	Favoritner AC		
1993–1999	SC Austria Lustenau	99	(23)
1999–2001	FC Vaduz		
- * Club domestic league appearances and goals

Joachim Moitzi (born 20 May 1969) is a former Austrian footballer who played as a forward.

== Honours ==
- Austrian Football First League: 1996–1997
