= Helmut Hauptmann =

German writer

- Born: March 12, 1928 (age 97); Berlin-Kreuzberg, Germany
- Occupation: Writer, literary editor, journalist

Helmut Hauptmann (born 12 March 1928) is a German writer who was mainly active in the then East Germany.

== Life ==
Helmut Hauptmann grew up in a working-class family in Berlin-Kreuzberg. Near the end of World War II, he served as a Luftwaffenhelfer in Berlin and became a Prisoner of war at a camp in Schleswig-Holstein. After the Abitur, he worked with the Magistrate of Greater Berlin. Since the early 1950s, he has worked as a literary editor, journalist, and writer in Berlin.

Hauptmann writes narrative works that reflect the ideological optimism of early East Germany as well as travel journals which captured the experience of the writer in the Eastern Bloc.

Hauptmann was a member of the Schriftstellerverband der DDR since 1956 and the P.E.N.-Zentrum of East Germany since 1972. He is the recipient of the Erich Weinert Medal (1958), the Heinrich Mann Prize (1960), the art prize of the Free German Trade Union Federation (1964), and as well as the Heinrich Heine Prize (1969).

Hauptmann and his wife Ursula currently live in Berlin-Weißensee.

== Works ==
- Das Geheimnis von Sosa (The Secret of Sosa), Berlin 1950
- Studiert wie Angelika und Hans Joachim! (Study like Angelika and Hans Joachim!), Berlin 1951
- Schwarzes Meer und weiße Rosen (Black Sea and White Roses), Berlin 1956
- Donaufahrt zu dritt (Donau Trip for Three), Berlin 1957
- Die Karriere des Hans Dietrich Borssdorf alias Jakow (The Career of Hans Dietrich Borssdorf alias Jakow), Berlin 1958
- Der Unsichtbare mit dem roten Hut (The Invisible with the Red Hat), Berlin 1958
- Sieben stellen die Uhr (The Clock hits Seven), Berlin 1959
- Hanna, Berlin 1963
- Das komplexe Abenteuer Schwedt (The Complex Adventurer Schwedt), Halle (Saale) 1964
- Der Kreis der Familie (The Family Circle), Halle 1964
- Blauer Himmel, blaue Helme (Blue Heavens, Blue Helmets), Halle (Saale) 1965
- Ivi, Halle (Saale) 1969
- Warum ich nach Horka ging (Why I go to Horka), Bautzen 1971
- Das unteilbare Leben (The Indivisible Life), Halle (Saale) 1972
- Standpunkt und Spielraum (Standpoint and Scope), Halle (Saale) 1977

== Editorial work ==
- DDR-Reportage, Leipzig 1969
