= Hugo Huppert =

Austrian poet, translator, and writer (1902–1982)

Hugo Huppert (5 June 1902 – 25 March 1982) was an Austrian poet, translator and writer. He was born in Bielitz, Austrian Silesia, and died in Vienna.

== Decorations and awards ==
- 1964: Heinrich Heine Prize (Ministry of Culture of the GDR)
- 1967: National Prize of the GDR
- 1976: Art Prize of the German Democratic Republic
- 1977: Austrian Cross of Honour for Science and Art, 1st class
