= Helmuth Aberle =

Austrian footballer

Personal information
- Date of birth: 10 June 1969 (age 57)
- Place of birth: Austria
- Position: Forward

Senior career*
Years	Team	Apps	(Gls)
–1992	ÖMV Stadlau		
1990–1991	→ Rapid Vienna (loan)	2	(0)
1992–1993	Kremser SC		
1993	SV Stockerau		
1993–1994	1. Wiener Neustädter SC	1	(0)
1994–1996	Admira/Wacker	36	(4)
1996–1998	SKN St. Pölten	13	(2)
1998–1999	First Vienna FC	15	(0)
1999–2003	ÖMV Stadlau	91	(43)
2003	SV Schwechat	4	(0)
2003–2004	Floridsdorfer AC	5	(0)
- * Club domestic league appearances and goals

Helmuth Aberle (born 10 June 1969) is a former Austrian footballer who played as a forward.
