= Peter Gosse =

German poet, prose author and essayist

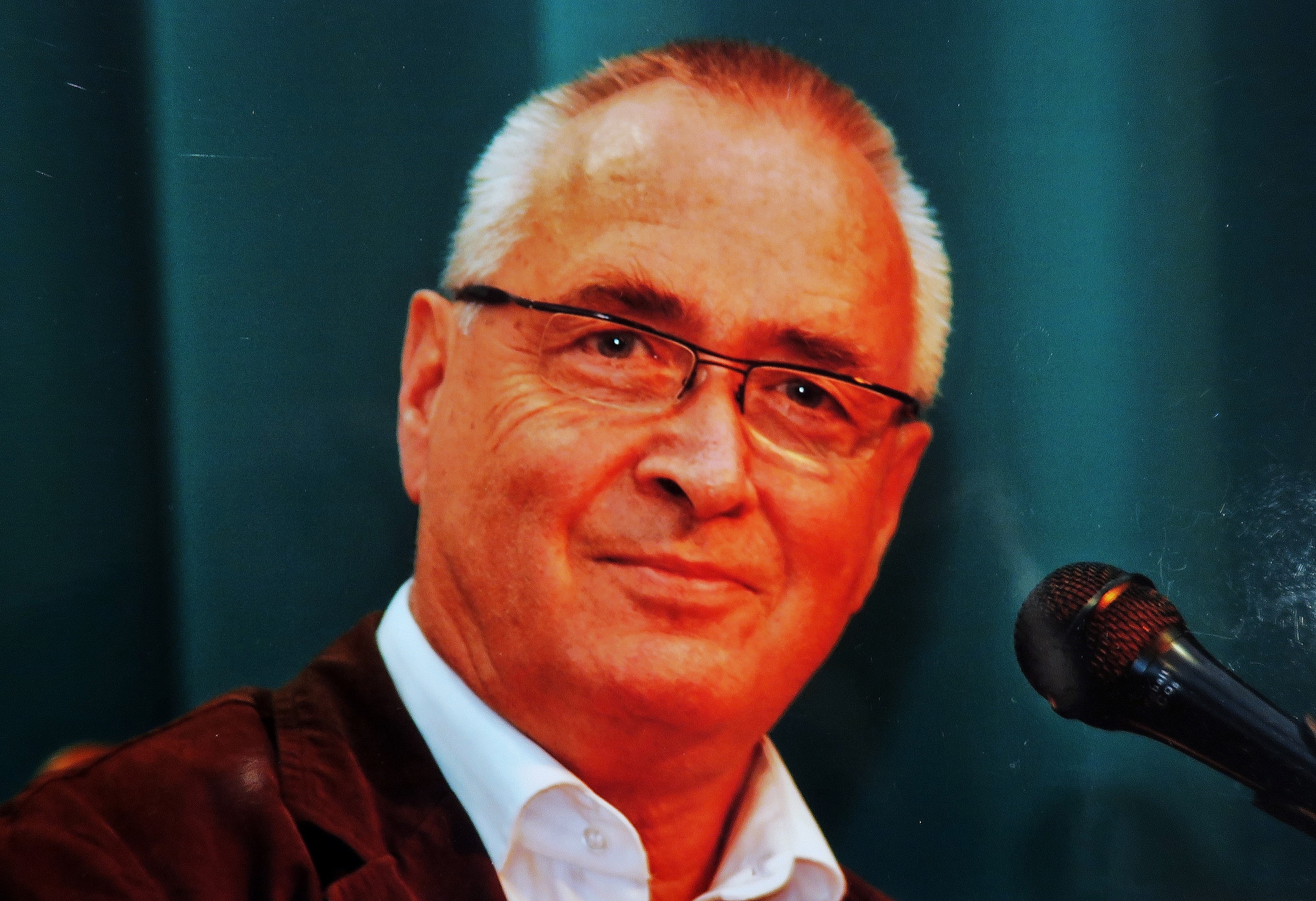
Gosse in 2012

Peter Gosse (born 6 October 1938 in Leipzig) is a German poet, prose author and essayist.

== Life ==
Peter Gosse first completed a study of high frequency technology in Moscow. After working as an engineer, he became a freelance writer in East Germany from 1968. Since 1985 he has been a lecturer of poetry at the German Institute for Literature in Leipzig, where he became the commissioned Director in 1993. Gosse is a member of the International PEN and since 2008, deputy President of the Sächsischen Akademie der Künste (Saxon Academy of the Arts).

== Works ==
- Gosse, Peter (1996). Gleisskörper : Gedichte (in German). Halle: Mitteldeutscher Verlag. ISBN 3-354-00916-0. OCLC 36216761.
- Gosse, Peter (2001). Seinsgunst : Gedichte (in German). Halle: Mitteldeutscher Verlag. ISBN 3-89812-092-9. OCLC 51842357.
- Gosse, Peter (1998). Phantomschmelz : Lyrik & Kurzprosa (in German). Halle: Mitteldeutscher Verlag. ISBN 3-932776-24-0. OCLC 40378178.
- Gosse, Peter (1986). Erwachsene Mitte : Gedichte, Geschichten, Stücke, Essays (in German). Leipzig: P. Reclam. ISBN 3-379-00032-9. OCLC 16801878.
- Gosse, Peter (1990). Standwaage : Gedichte (in German). Halle: Mitteldeutscher Verlag. ISBN 3-354-00635-8. OCLC 24518459.
- Gosse, Peter (1997). Dein eurasisches Antlitz Schriften zu bildender Kunst und Literatur (in German). Leipzig. ISBN 978-3-9805299-8-3. OCLC 75807260.
- Gosse, Peter (2003). Neles Selen Bilder sichten (in German). Halle (Saale). ISBN 978-3-89812-179-8. OCLC 249441605.

== Awards ==
- Heinrich Heine prize of the Ministry for culture of the GDR 1985
- Heinrich Mann Prize of the Academy of Arts, Berlin 1991
