= Peter Rühmkorf =

German writer (1929–2008)

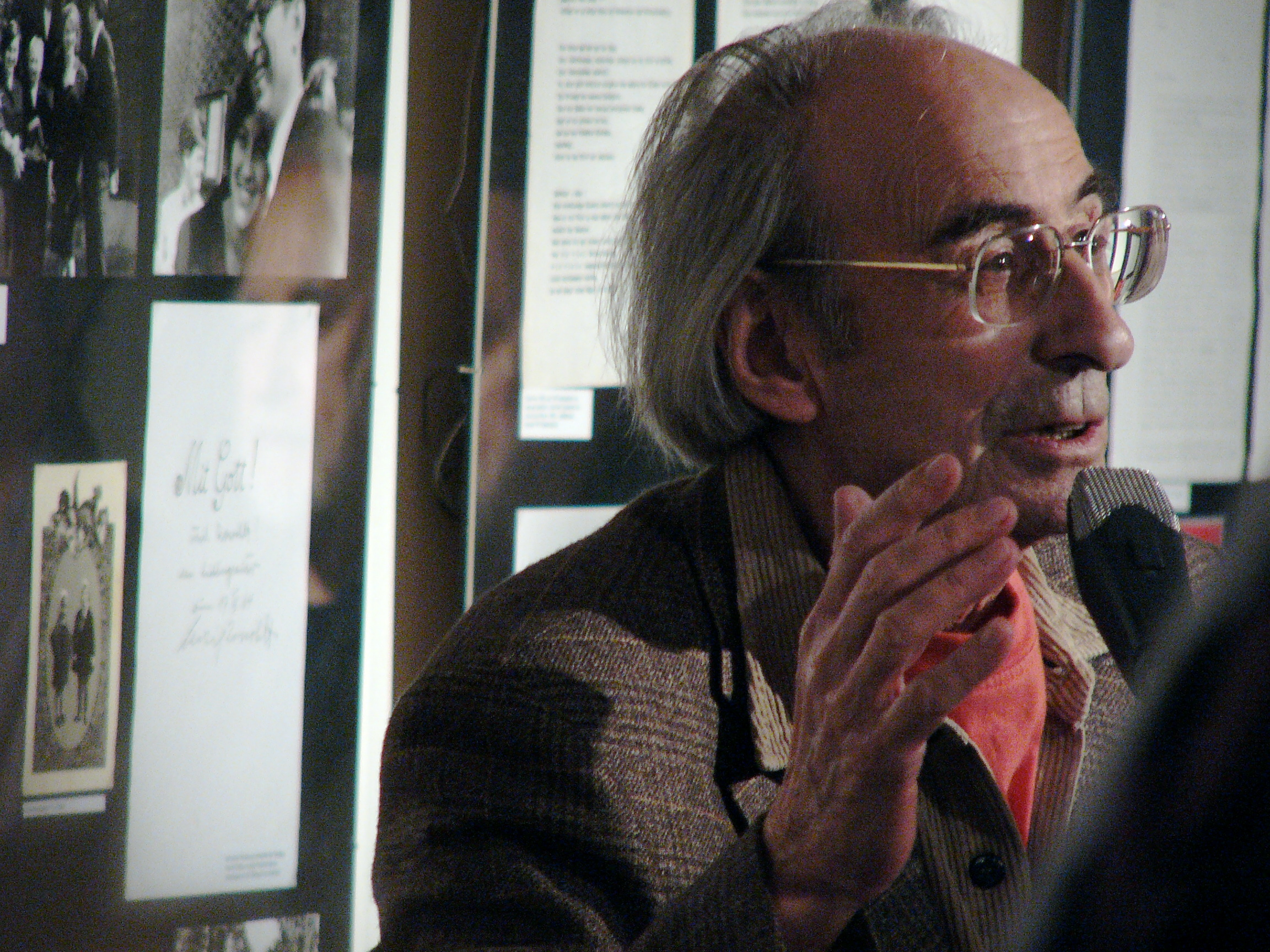
- Rühmkorf in Hamburg, 2004
- Born: 25 October 1929; Dortmund, North Rhine-Westphalia, Germany
- Died: 8 June 2008 (aged 78); Roseburg, Schleswig-Holstein, Germany
- Writing career
- Pen name: Leo Doletzki, Leslie Maier, Johannes Fontara, Lyng, John Frieder, Hans-Werner Weber, Harry Flieder, and Hans Hingst
- Notable awards: Georg Büchner Prize; Heinrich Heine Prize; Erich Kästner Prize; Arno Schmidt Prize

Peter Rühmkorf (25 October 1929 – 8 June 2008) was a German writer who significantly influenced German post-war literature.

Rühmkorf's literary career started in 1952 in Hamburg with the magazine Zwischen den Kriegen ("Between the Wars"), which the poet and essayist Werner Riegel and he edited and mainly wrote, until Riegel's early death in 1956. Both of them belonged to the initiators of the Studentenkurier, an influential monthly for young German intellectuals and students.

Rühmkorf was awarded every important German award, including the Georg Büchner Prize, the Heinrich Heine Prize and the Erich Kästner Prize. Rühmkorf was also among the four who were ever awarded with the Arno Schmidt Prize. His pseudonyms were Leo Doletzki, Leslie Maier, Johannes Fontara, Lyng, John Frieder, Hans-Werner Weber, Harry Flieder, and Hans Hingst.

His voice can be heard on: Früher, als wir die großen Ströme noch ... (suite for speaker and ensemble) with Dietmar Bonnen and Andreas Schilling. On stage and on record he was accompanied by jazz musicians Michael Naura on piano and Wolfgang Schlüter on vibes for more than 30 years.

== Works ==
- (with Werner Riegel): Heiße Lyrik, Limes, Wiesbaden 1956 [poems]
- Irdisches Vergnügen in g. Fünfzig Gedichte, Rowohlt, Hamburg 1959 [poems]
- Wolfgang Borchert. Biographie, Rowohlt, Hamburg 1961 [biography]
- Kunststücke. Fünfzig Gedichte nebst einer Anleitung zum Widerspruch, Rowohlt, Hamburg 1962 [poems, essay]
- Über das Volksvermögen. Exkurse in den literarischen Untergrund, Rowohlt, Reinbek 1967 [monograph]
- Was heißt hier Volsinii? Bewegte Szenen aus dem klassischen Wirtschaftsleben, Rowohlt, Reinbek 1969 [stage play]
- Die Jahre die ihr kennt. Anfälle und Erinnerungen, Rowohlt, Reinbek Rowohlt 1972 [autobiography]
- Lombard gibt den Letzten. Ein Schauspiel, Wagenbach, Berlin 1972 [stage play]
- Die Handwerker kommen. Ein Familiendrama, Wagenbach, Berlin 1974 [stage play]
- Walther von der Vogelweide, Klopstock und ich, Rowohlt, Reinbek 1975 [essays]
- Phoenix – voran! Gedichte, pawel pan, Dreieich 1977 [poems]
- Strömungslehre I. Poesie, Rowohlt, Reinbek 1978 [poems, essays]
- Haltbar bis Ende 1999, Rowohlt, Reinbek 1979 [poems]
- Auf Wiedersehen in Kenilworth. Ein Märchen in dreizehn Kapiteln, Fischer, Frankfurt on Main 1980 [fairy tales]
- Im Fahrtwind. Gedichte und Geschichte, Bertelsmann, Berlin (et al.) 1980 [poems, prose]
- agar agar – zaurzaurim. Zur Naturgeschichte des Reims und der menschlichen Anklangsnerven, Rowohlt, Reinbek 1981 [university lectures]
- Kleine Fleckenkunde, Haffmans, Zürich 1982 [inkblot studies]
- Der Hüter des Misthaufens. Aufgeklärte Märchen, Rowohlt, Reinbek 1983 [fairy tales]
- Blaubarts letzte Reise. Ein Märchen, pawel pan, Dreieich 1983 [fairy tale]
- Bleib erschütterbar und widersteh. Aufsätze – Reden – Selbstgespräche, Rowohlt, Reinbek 1984 [essays, addresses, prose]
- Mein Lesebuch, Fischer, Frankfurt on Main 1986 [anthology]
- Außer der Liebe nichts. LiebesgedichteRowohlt, Reinbek 1986 [love poems]
- Dintemann und Schindemann. Aufgeklärte Märchen, Reclam, Leipzig 1986 [fairy tales]
- Selbstredend und selbstreimend. Gedichte – Gedanken – Lichtblicke, Reclam, Stuttgart 1987 [poems, prose]
- Werner Riegel. „ ... beladen mit Sendung. Dichter und armes Schwein“, Reclam, Stuttgart 1988 [biography and edition]
- Einmalig wie wir alle, Rowohlt, Reinbek 1989
- Dreizehn deutsche Dichter, Rowohlt, Reinbek 1989 [essays]
- Selbst III/88. Aus der Fassung, Haffmans, Zürich 1989 [autobiographica]
- Komm raus! Gesänge, Märchen, Kunststücke, Wagenbach, Berlin 1992 [poems, songs, fairy tales, prose]
- Deutschland, ein Lügenmärchen, Wallstein, Göttingen 1993 [essay]
- Lass leuchten! Memos, Märchen, TaBu, Gedichte, Selbstporträt mit und ohne Hut, Rowohlt, Reinbek 1993 [collection]
- Tabu I. Tagebücher 1989–1991, Rowohlt, Reinbek 1995 [autobiography]
- Gedichte, Rowohlt, Reinbek 1996 [poems]
- Ich habe Lust, im weiten Feld... Betrachtungen einer abgeräumten Schachfigur, Wallstein, Göttingen 1996 [essays]
- Die Last, die Lust und die List. Aufgeklärte Märchen, Rowohlt, Reinbek 1996 [fairy tales]
- Ein Buch der Freundschaft, Rommerskirchen, Remagen-Rolandseck 1996
- Lethe mit Schuß. Gedichte, Suhrkamp, Frankfurt on Main 1998 [poems]
- wenn – aber dann. Vorletzte Gedichte, Rowohl, Reinbek 1999 [poems]
- Von mir zu Euch für uns, Steidl, Göttingen 1999 [poems]
- Wo ich gelernt habe, Wallstein, Göttingen 1999 [autobiographica]
- (with Horst Janssen): Mein lieber Freund und Kompanjung, Felix Jud, Hamburg 1999
- (with Robert Gernhardt): In gemeinsamer Sache. Gedichte über Liebe und Tod, Natur und Kunst, Haffmans, Zürich 2000 [poems]
- Das Lied der Deutschen, Wallstein, Göttingen 2001 (on Hoffmann von Fallersleben)
- Funken fliegen zwischen Hut und Schuh. Lichtblicke, Schweifsterne, Donnerkeile, ed. Stefan Ulrich Meyer, Deutsche Verlagsanstalt, Munich 2003 [poems]
- Tabu II. Tagebücher 1971–1972Rowohlt, Reinbek 2004 [autobiography]
- Wenn ich mal richtig ICH sag ... . Ein Lese-Bilderbuch, Steidl, Göttingen 2004 [prose]
- Aufwachen und Wiederfinden. Gedichte, Insel, Frankfurt on Main 2007 [poems]
- Paradiesvogelschiß. Gedichte, Rowohlt, Reinbek 2008 [last poems]
