= Moritz von Aberle =

German Catholic theologian (1819–1875)

- Born: 25 April 1819; Rottum, Baden-Württemberg, Germany
- Died: 3 November 1875 (aged 56); Tübingen
- Occupation: Professor

Moritz von Aberle (25 April 1819 – 3 November 1875) was a German Catholic theologian.

== Life ==
Moritz von Aberle was born on 25 April 1819 at Rottum in Baden-Württemberg, Germany. He became a professor in the Obergymnasium at Ehingen in 1845, director of the Wilhelmstift in 1848, and a professor of moral theology and New Testament exegesis at the University of Tübingen in 1850, a position he retained until the day of his death. He died at Tübingen on 3 November 1875.

== Career ==
He had a considerable number of pupils in both theology and scripture, but he was especially devoted to Scriptural studies. He emphasized the activity of the human bearers of revelation, without changing it into a purely natural process. Von Aberle published the results of his investigations in a series of articles. The main thoughts of these articles were collected and published under the title "Introduction to the New Testament", by Dr. Paul Schanz (Freiburg, 1877). He took also an active part in the struggle for ecclesiastical liberty in Württemberg, and his strong newspaper articles forced the State to arrange Church matters on a tolerable basis.

Aberle argued that the Gospels and the Acts of the Apostles were apologetic writings, meeting certain needs of the Apostolic times. Maas maintains that this view "cannot be sustained".
