= Dieter Süverkrüp =

German singer-songwriter and artist (1934–2025)

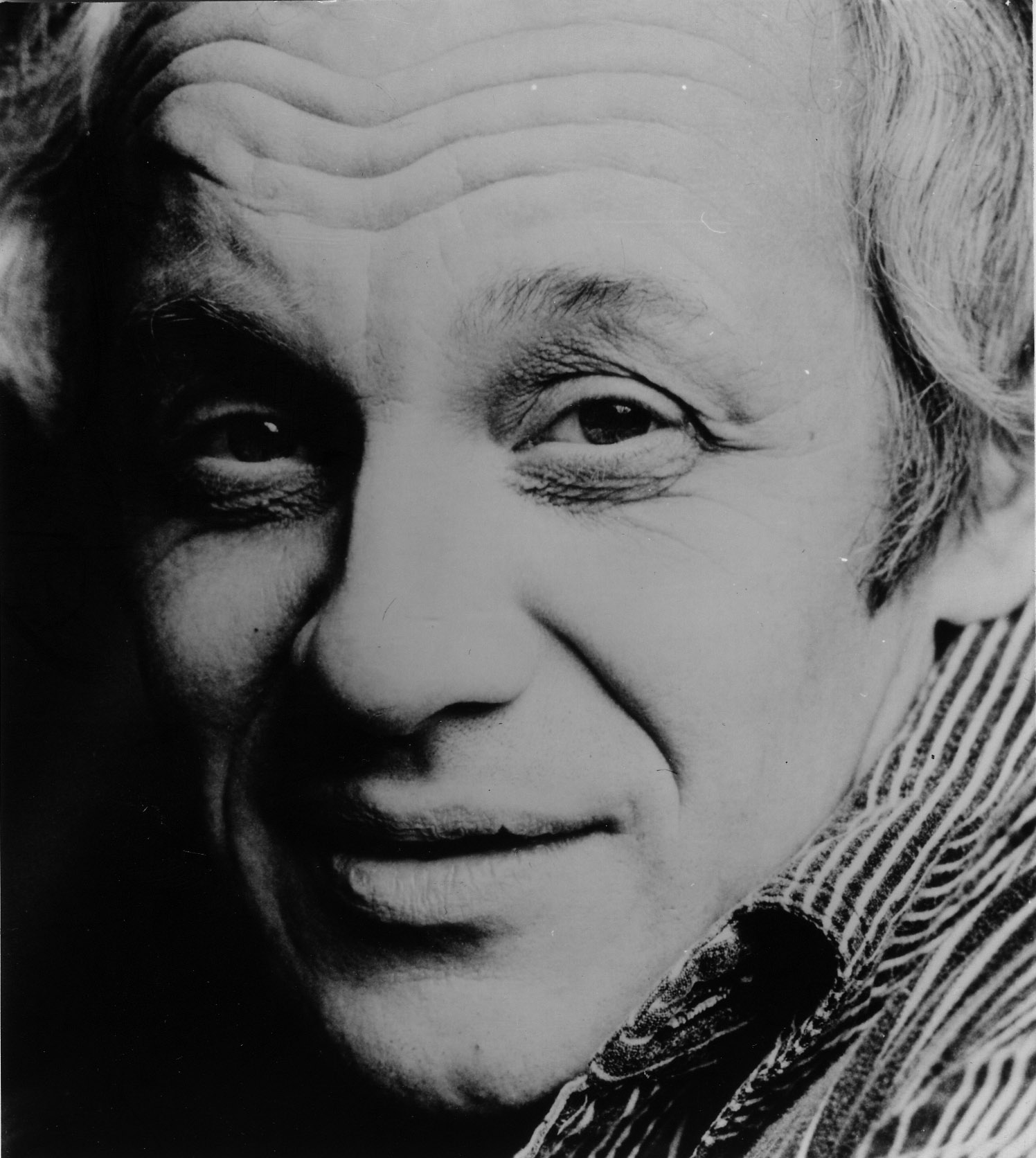
- Dieter Süverkrüp
- Born: 30 May 1934; Düsseldorf, Germany
- Died: 16 March 2025 (aged 90); Cologne, Germany
- Occupations: Singer-songwriter, cabaret artist, graphic designer
- Children: Ben Süverkrüp

Dieter Süverkrüp (30 May 1934 – 16 March 2025) was a German singer-songwriter, cabaret artist, and graphic designer.

Süverkrüp is considered a founding figure of the German singer-songwriter movement. His most influential work was produced during the 1960s and 1970s. With his socialist convictions and long-term membership in the German Communist Party (DKP), he was a prominent voice in the predominantly left-leaning singer-songwriter culture. His works were characterized by virtuosic guitar playing, wordplay, and contemporary political themes, which often made his songs fully understandable only within their historical context.

His best-known songs include Die erschröckliche Moritat vom Kryptokommunisten (The Frightful Ballad of the Crypto-Communist), Baggerführer Willibald (Willibald the Bulldozer Driver), and the children's musical Das Auto Blubberbumm.

As one of the few artists to achieve recognition in both the German Democratic Republic (GDR) and the Federal Republic of Germany, he won significant awards, including the German Cabaret Award in 1986.

He was the father of pianist Ben Süverkrüp, who, along with cabaret artist Tina Teubner, received the German Cabaret Award in the chanson category in 2010.

== Life ==
=== Youth and early career ===
Süverkrüp studied at the Düsseldorf School of Applied Arts. He worked for 18 years in an advertising agency, primarily as an art director.

In his spare time, he initially played jazz guitar in the band Feetwarmers (1956–1959), with which he was named Germany's best jazz guitarist at the German Amateur Jazz Festival in 1957. The virtuosic guitar technique and broad artistic expression he developed during this period shaped his later works. His bandmates included the future finance minister Manfred Lahnstein.

He began his career as a political singer-songwriter in 1958 through his friendship with Gerd Semmer, which led to several record releases. Semmer drew on the song traditions of the French Revolution and the Revolution of 1848, as well as writing original lyrics. Süverkrüp set these to music and performed them with his own guitar accompaniment. The chansons, chants, couplets, and vaudevilles, often popular street songs in their time, mocked the aristocracy or celebrated revolutionary heroes in a typically coarse tone.

=== Politicization and workers' songs ===
In 1961, Süverkrüp founded the Pläne publishing house and indie label together with Gerd Semmer, Arno Klönne, and Frank Werkmeister.

Süverkrüp's first professional release came when he recorded two short LPs (7″ format, 33⅓ rpm) for Pläne with songs from the French Revolution, translated by Gerd Semmer. Further recordings with Semmer followed, with Süverkrüp composing the music and Semmer providing lyrics, often drawn from Semmer's poetry collection Widerworte, inspired by political chansons of Kurt Tucholsky or Frank Wedekind. These were rich in quotations and collages, frequently from advertisements. In these releases, Süverkrüp's music took a backseat to Semmer's lyrics. The duo was a precursor to the singer-songwriter movement, though in the 1950s, they were largely alone in this art form.

Their prominence grew with the Easter March movement in the early 1960s, as political songs regained traction in German consciousness. From the 1960s, Süverkrüp began writing his own lyrics and performing them at political events like the Easter Marches. He sang original compositions, classic workers' songs, and songs from the U.S. civil rights movement.

Süverkrüp and Hanns Dieter Hüsch, who also worked with Pläne, initially struggled to find a record label. They self-published records with four songs each, distributing them from their homes under the Pläne name. As sales and production demands grew, the publisher professionalized as a music producer. Their first LP, Songs of the European Resistance Against Fascism 1933–1963, translated by Gerd Semmer, was released in 1965.

Pläne became a defining part of the West German left. Artists like Hannes Wader, Giora Feidman, Liederjan, Lydie Auvray, Oysterband, Zupfgeigenhansel, and Naked Raven released work there, alongside the first German releases of Mikis Theodorakis and the socialist Chilean singer-songwriter Víctor Jara. Süverkrüp contributed his graphic talents, designing many album covers and visuals for Pläne releases. Despite being financially self-sustaining, the publisher was often perceived as DKP-funded, likely due to Süverkrüp's strong involvement.

Süverkrüp's first LP of original songs, Fröhlich ißt Du Wiener Schnitzel, lacked a cohesive concept. Its songs ranged from playful tracks like Lied eines heiseren Kindes (Song of a Hoarse Child) to a straightforward parody of General. Touristenflamenco depicted Germans vacationing in Franco's Spain, rediscovering their fascist sympathies, while Wie man in Düsseldorf eine Kunstausstellung eröffnet (How to Open an Art Exhibition in Düsseldorf) showcased the wordplay that became a hallmark of his lyrics.

The debate over the German Emergency Acts heavily influenced his early songs. He uncompromisingly criticized the continuities between the National Socialist era and the young Federal Republic. For him, rearmament and the Emergency Acts were expressions of old thinking in new guise. In Nachtgebet eines Untertanen (Night Prayer of a Subject, 1966), he listed the groups and trends he believed led to the Emergency Acts and their consequences.

In Lagerlied (Camp Song), he described a camp established under the Emergency Acts, eerily reminiscent of Nazi concentration camps, with the sole difference that inmates could freely express their opinions—a right that did nothing to change the conditions of murder and degradation. For Süverkrüp, the Federal Republic's democratic claims were little more than meaningless "humanitarian rhetoric."

The Nazi era remained ever-present in the Federal Republic for Süverkrüp. Many perpetrators resumed high positions, while surviving victims remained societal outsiders, and West German society, basking in the Economic Miracle, wanted to move on. In the simply performed Kirschen auf Sahne (Cherries on Cream, 1965), he depicted an everyday scene.

From this period came his two most enduring political works: the Vietnam-Zyklus (Vietnam Cycle, 1966), which addressed the Vietnam War early in West German history, and the Schröckliche Moritat vom Kryptokommunisten (Frightful Ballad of the Crypto-Communist, 1965), which satirized common anti-communism clichés in the Federal Republic. The Vietnam Cycle, comprising six songs, portrayed the war from various perspectives: Vietnamese (Partisanenbekämpfung – Partisan Combat), a U.S. soldier (Western-Ballade – Western Ballad), a U.S. commander (Rein Technisches – Purely Technical), the involved industry (Wirtschaftsbericht – Economic Report), with Hexenverbrennung (Witch Burning) giving the war a historical dimension (comparing past witch hunts to modern napalm), and Gespräche der Herren Müller (Conversations of the Messrs. Müller) offering a political-imperialist interpretation.

The Erschröckliche Moritat… humorously depicted a communist's harmless daily routine using the vocabulary and stereotypes of anti-communism. The communist brushes his teeth with brandy, drinks vodka for breakfast, dons "subversion boots," and engages in "illegal underground work." By 9:10 a.m., he "devours the first child (blue-eyed, blond)." He disguises himself, speaks Rhenish instead of Saxon, and visits the barber to look more "agitprop-like." He "communizes" in a shack behind the railway embankment, kisses his wife, plays hide-and-seek with the kids, and removes his subversion boots after a day's work.

=== Voice of the left ===
In 1964, Süverkrüp performed as one of 13 artists at the first Chanson Folklore International Festival at Burg Waldeck, which became a pilgrimage site for the folk and singer-songwriter scene. Until 1969, artists like Franz Josef Degenhardt, Reinhard Mey, Schobert & Black, Hannes Wader, and others who later gained fame performed there. From the GDR, Perry Friedman, Hermann Hähnel, and Lin Jaldati participated, with international guests including Hedy West and Pete Seeger. Ivan Rebroff also performed folklore. The festival quickly became a scene hub but developed a self-referential dynamic, becoming complacent and resembling the West German society it aimed to critique. In 1966, Süverkrüp mockingly addressed this in Wünsche des Publikums (Audience Wishes).

Süverkrüp's lyrics became more politically direct, shifting from describing everyday life and multifaceted left-wing critique to focusing on monopoly capitalism, often more explicitly than his contemporaries. Deutschlandfunk described him:

Among the pioneers of the West German singer-songwriter scene—like Hannes Wader, Franz Josef Degenhardt, or Reinhard Mey—he was always the one who most relentlessly criticized Western Europe's political system, using only the term "capitalism" for the social market economy.

Süverkrüp performed multiple times at the GDR's Festival of Political Songs starting in 1971, a 17-year DKP member at the time.

=== Children's songs and artistic diversification ===
While his explicitly political songs grew more direct, Süverkrüp also produced a wide range of other works, such as children's and Christmas songs. Children's songs like Baggerführer Willibald (1970) and the musical Das Auto Blubberbumm (1976) were political but more open-ended than his other works from the period. Written in simple children's book language, Baggerführer Willibald was a fixture in alternative kindergartens and nurseries, influencing children of the 68ers. In the song, Willibald is frustrated that workers build grand houses owned by the boss, so they introduce socialism on a small scale, building their own homes and a swimming pool.

Though a key figure in the left-wing cultural scene, Süverkrüp never fully abandoned other music forms. In 1976, his melodrama Alwin und Alwine – ein Musikerschicksal was performed at the Cologne Courses for New Music under Mauricio Kagel's direction.

=== After 1989 ===
In the 1990s, he focused more on visual arts, creating drawings, etchings, engravings, and oil paintings. He wrote the libretto for the 1995 children's opera Vom Teufel mit den drei goldenen Haaren (The Devil with the Three Golden Hairs) by Matthias Schlothfeld, Ben Süverkrüp, and Wolfgang Hufschmidt. Around the 2000s, he composed stage music for a new production of Georg Büchner's Danton's Death. In 1992–93, he held the Poetics Chair at the Folkwang University in Essen and wrote the radio play Das Ding in Ü. an der Ö. in 1993.

In 2004, his drawings, etchings, engravings, and oil paintings were exhibited in Berlin, Bremen, Düsseldorf, and Lübeck. The Heinrich Heine Institute in Düsseldorf showcased his "Crossword Pictures" in 2004 and "Süverkrüp's Forgery Workshop" in 2016.

Dieter Süverkrüp died at age 90 in March 2025 in Cologne.

== Parodies of Christmas songs ==
- In his version of Morgen kommt der Weihnachtsmann (Tomorrow Comes Santa Claus), Süverkrüp mocks Christmas consumerism while criticizing political conditions.
- In 1969, Süverkrüp wrote a parody of the Christmas song Leise rieselt der Schnee (Softly Falls the Snow).
- Also in 1969, Süverkrüp created a rework of Stille Nacht, heilige Nacht (Silent Night, Holy Night), while worked as a copywriter in an advertising firm, with the first two verses reflecting personal experiences.

== Filmography ==
- 1967: Im Busch von Mexiko – Das Rätsel B. Traven (TV, West Germany, five parts, dir.: Jürgen Goslar)
- 1977: Danton's Death (studio recording)
- 1978: Brandstellen

== Awards ==
- 1976: Heinrich Heine Prize (Ministry of Culture of the GDR)
- 1986: German Cabaret Award
- 1995: German Record Critics' Award

== Publications as an author ==
- Süverkrüp, Dieter; Autorengruppe (1993). Das Ding in Ü. an der Ö. Ein Text [The Thing in Ü. on the Ö. A Text.]. Vol. 7. Essen: Die Blaue Eule. ISBN 3-89206-560-8. "A series of the Folkwang University"
- Süverkrüp, Dieter (2002). Achten, Udo (ed.). Süverkrüps Liederjahre 1963–1985ff [Süverkrüp's Song Years 1963–1985ff]. Düsseldorf: Grupello. ISBN 3-933749-88-3. "Contains many of his song lyrics, 40 etchings, and a continuous commentary on the songs"
- Süverkrüp, Dieter (2002). Süverkrüps Liederjahre. 1963–1985ff [Süverkrüp's Song Years. 1963–1985ff]. Vol. 4 Audiobooks. CD-Box. Düsseldorf-Lübeck: Grupello/Conträr Musik. ISBN 3-933749-89-1. "Booklet for the CD box of the same name"

== Discography ==
=== Solo or releases under his name as (co-)performer ===
- 1959: Ça Ira – Chansons aus der französischen Revolution, 1. Folge (texts by Gerd Semmer) (EP with 6 tracks, DDR: Eterna 5 10 042), no 2nd part released in the DDR
- 1962: Ça Ira – Lieder der französischen Revolution 1 (texts by Gerd Semmer) (EP with 10 tracks, Pläne 1 101)
- 1962: Warnung – Rattengift ausgelegt! Kinder & Haustiere fernhalten (texts by Gerd Semmer) (EP with 6 tracks, Pläne 2 101)
- 1963: Ça Ira – Lieder der französischen Revolution 2 (texts by Gerd Semmer) (EP with 8 tracks, Pläne 1 102)
- 1963: Ein Lied, drei, vier – Moderne Chansons aus dem Schlaraffenland (texts by Gerd Semmer) (EP with 7 tracks, Pläne 2 102)
- 1965: Fröhlich ißt du Wiener Schnitzel (LP, Pläne S 22 301)
- 1967: Die widerborstigen Gesänge des Dieter Süverkrüp (LP, Pläne S 22 302)
- 1969: Ça Ira – Lieder der französischen Revolution (texts by Gerd Semmer) (LP, BRD: Pläne 11 101 / [1970:] DDR: Eterna 8 15 033)
- 1970: Süverkrüps Hitparade (LP, Pläne S 22 303)
- 1970: Stille Nacht allerseits! – Dieter Süverkrüp singt garstige Weihnachtslieder (EP with 4 tracks, Pläne PENG 5)
- 1970: Der Baggerführer Willibald – Dieter Süverkrüp singt Kinderlieder (EP with 4 tracks, Pläne PENG 6)
- 1971: Rote Fahnen sieht man besser (Phrix-Lied // Kleinstadtlehrlinge) (Single, Pläne PENG 12)
- 1972: Zusammengesammelte Werke (LP Compilation, Pläne S 0200)
- 1973: Bayrisches Heimatlied (Single B-side, Ohr 57.012 [A-side Floh de Cologne: Der Löwenthaler])
- 1973: 1848 – Lieder der deutschen Revolution (LP, BRD: Pläne S 11 102 / [1974:] DDR: Amiga 8 55 410 / [1998:] CD, Conträr 8338-2)
- 1973: Dieter Süverkrüp (LP Compilation, Amiga 8 55 329)
- 1974: Süverkrüp Live – Lieder und Texte (also as: Warum wird so einer Kommunist? – Süverkrüp Live! with different cover) (LP, Pläne S 22 304)
- 1980: So weit alles klar! (LP, Pläne 88 205 S)
- 1983: Lied eines heiseren Kindes (LP Compilation, Pläne 88 333)
- 1986: Erich Mühsam – Ich lade Euch zum Requiem (with Walter Andreas Schwarz and Vridolin Enxing) (LP, Pläne 88 502 / [1995:] CD, Conträr 4302-2)
- 1987: Pauline spielt Gitarre (with Vridolin Enxing) (Cassette, Pläne 8568)
- 1996: Süverkrüp singt Graßhoffs Bellmann (with Ben Süverkrüp) (CD, Conträr 5)
- 2002: Süverkrüps Liederjahre – 1963–1985 ff. (4 CDs Box, Conträr 30)
- 2015: Ça Ira – Lieder der französischen Revolution (texts by Gerd Semmer) (CD, Conträr 72)

=== With others ===
- 1957: The Feetwarmers (Jürgen Buchholtz, Klaus Doldinger, with Dieter Süverkrüp et al.): Gruß an Zarah (EP with 4 tracks, Brunswick 10 806 EPB)
- 1963: Perry Friedman & Dieter Süverkrüp: Solidarity Forever – Amerikanische Arbeiterlieder (EP with 8 tracks, Pläne 4101)
- 1963: Perry Friedman & Dieter Süverkrüp: I’m on My Way – Amerikanische Negerlieder (EP with 7 tracks, Pläne 4102)
- 1963: Ostersongs 1962/63 – Lieder zum Ostermarsch (Vocals: Fasia Jansen, Inge Börner, Ingrid Süverkrüp, Günter Göpfert (banjo), Dieter Süverkrüp (guitar). The Bricklayer-Skiffle-Group, the Skiffle-Plackers) (EP with 8 tracks, Pläne 3101)
- 1964: Wir wollen dazu was sagen – Neue Lieder gegen die Bombe (Vocals: Fasia Jansen, Ingrid and Dieter Süverkrüp, Hannes Stütz, and group. Musicians: Heinz Schlegel (trumpet), Heinz Dommes (clarinet, drums), Dieter Süverkrüp (guitar), and the Skiffle-Pluckers) (EP with 7 tracks, Pläne 3102)
- 1968: Floh de Cologne & Dieter Süverkrüp: Vietnam – Für fünf Sprech und Singstimmen, Streicher, Bläser, Orgel, Bass, Schlagwerk, Klavier und Gitarren (LP, Pläne 33 101)
- 1970: Die Internationale // Brüder, zur Sonne, zur Freiheit (with: Dieter Süverkrüp, Franz-Josef Degenhardt, Fasia Jansen, Hanns Ernst Jäger, Die Conrads, Hanns Dieter Hüsch, Dietrich Kittner, Lerryn, Hannes Stütz, Münchener Songgruppe, Song-Gruppe Hamburg) (Single, Pläne PENG 7)
- 1971: Interpol Köln, Die Conrads & Dieter Süverkrüp: Wir machen den Roten Punkt (EP with 3 tracks, Pläne PENG 13)
- 1976: Das Auto Blubberbumm – Ein Musical für Kinder (ab 8) (Music and text: Dieter Süverkrüp, Wolfgang Dauner, with: Volker Kriegel, Albert Mangelsdorff, Ack van Rooyen, Eberhard Weber, Inge Brandenburg, Jörg Gebhardt et al.) (LP, Pläne K 20 903)
- 1977: Rotkäppchen – ein Märchen mit viel Rock und Pop für kleine und große Kinder; nach Jewgenij Schwarz (Floh de Cologne, Christiane & Fredrik, Franz Josef Degenhardt, Fasia, Perry Friedman, Hanns Dieter Hüsch, Dieter Süverkrüp, Hannes Wader) (LP, Pläne K 20 905)
- 1978: Die Leute von der Annostrasse – Für Leute ab 10 (Text: Peter Maiwald, Music: Mike Herting, with: Rick Abao, Fasia Jansen, Uschi Flacke, Petra Grabowski, Hanns Dieter Hüsch, Dieter Scholz, Dieter Süverkrüp, Mike Herting, Jan Reimer et al.) (LP, Pläne DK0099)
- 1996: Quartett '67 (Hanns Dieter Hüsch, Wolfgang Neuss, Franz Josef Degenhardt, Dieter Süverkrüp) (2 CDs, live recording 1968 by Saarländischer Rundfunk, Conträr 4304-2)
- 2004: Fritz Grasshoff: Hört mal her, ihr Zeitgenossen (Fritz Graßhoff with Pit Klein, Lothar “Black” Lechleiter, and Dieter Süverkrüp) (CD, Conträr 2912-2)

=== Featured on compilations (some live recordings) ===
- 1970: Hören Sie mal rot! – Arbeiterlieder-Festival (LP, Pläne S 66 201)
- 1970: Rot sehen kann jeder… hören Sie mal rot! (LP, Pläne 0300)
- 1971: Lehrlinge halten zusammen (LP, Pläne S 33 501)
- 1972: 3. Festival des politischen Liedes 1972 (LP, Eterna 8 15 058)
- 1973: Politische Lieder, Mitschnitte von den X. Weltfestspielen (LP, Eterna 8 15 065)
- 1973: Für antiimperialistische Solidarität, Frieden und Freundschaft! – X. Weltfestspiele 1973 (LP, Eohr 28 773)
- 1974: Internationales Konzert: Solidarität mit Chile (LP, Pläne 19 574)
- 1974: Concert for Chile – Live recording of the solidarity concert “For Victor Jara,” 31 May 1974, Essen, Grugahalle (2 LPs, Pläne S 88 113)
- 1976: Folklore International (2 LPs, Pläne 0500-01)
- 1977: Rote Lieder 70–76 (LP, Amiga 8 45 134)
- 1977: GegenBILDlieder (LP, Eigelstein ES 2010)
- 1978: Rote Lieder – 8. Festival des politischen Liedes (LP, Eterna 8 45 149)
- 1978: Das Fest unserer Zeit – Live vom UZ-Volksfest (LP, Pläne G-6-0168)
- 1980: Zehnkampf – Festival des politischen Liedes 1970–1980 (2 LPs, Amiga 8 45 190-91)
- 1981: Künstler für den Frieden – 2. Forum der Krefelder Initiative, Dortmund, 21 November '81 – Live-Mitschnitt der Abschlußveranstaltung, Westfalenhalle Dortmund (2 LPs, Revue A 6042/3)
- 1982: Wir wollen leben – Lieder gegen den Untergang (2 LPs, Folk Freak/Pläne FF 3005/6)
- 2000: Festival des Politischen Liedes – die 70er (CD, Pläne 88 838)
- 2002: Folk und Liedermacher an Rhein und Ruhr (2 CDs, supplement to the book of the same name, No Ethno/agenda 2001/2)
- 2007: Für wen wir singen – Liedermacher in Deutschland (4× 3 CDs, featured on 4 of these CDs, Bear Family, BCD 16905 CP, BCD 16906 CP, BCD 16908 CP)
- 2008: Die Burg Waldeck Festivals 1964–1969 – Chansons Folklore International (10 CDs, Bear Family BCD 16017 JC)
- 2009: Dass nichts bleibt, wie es war (150 Jahre Arbeiter- und Freiheitslieder) Teil 1 1844-1918 (3 CDs, BCD 16917 CP)
- 2009: Dass nichts bleibt, wie es war (150 Jahre Arbeiter- und Freiheitslieder) Teil 4 1946-1990 (3 CDs, BCD 16920 CP)

== Documentary film ==
- 1976: Dieter Süverkrüp (DEFA short documentary, dir. Dieter Raue)

== Bibliography ==
- Rothschild, Thomas (1980). Rothschild, Thomas (ed.). Dieter Süverkrüp. Frankfurt am Main: Fischer. pp. 170–177. ISBN 3-596-22959-6.
- Bittner, Wolfgang; vom Hofe, Mark (2006). Der Schöpfer des Baggerführers Willibald: Dieter Süverkrüp [The Creator of Willibald the Bulldozer Driver: Dieter Süverkrüp]. Bad Honnef: Horlemann. ISBN 3-89502-222-5.
