= Liederjan =

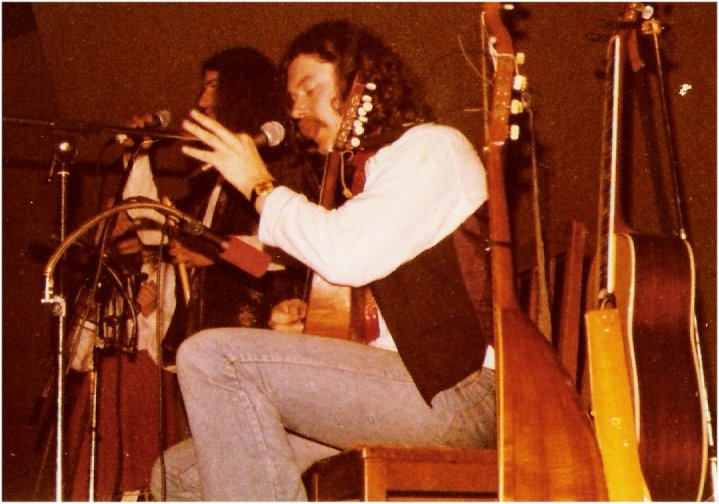
Liederjan in Concert (presumably in 1978 at Schwenningen)

Liederjan is a north-German folk group. It originated as Tramps & Hawkers, which played Irish traditional music in the early 1970s. They gradually started playing German folk music, and in 1975 formed the group Liederjan.

The principal members of the band were Anselm Noffke (died 2003), Jörg Ermisch und Jochen Wiegandt. Others who played with Liederjan were Rainer Prüss, Edzard Wagenaar, Wolfgang Rieck, Jürgen Leo, Klaus Irmscher, and currently Hanne Balzer and Michael Lempelius.

== Discography ==
- 1976 Live aus der Fabrik
- 1978 Mädchen, Meister, Mönche
- 1979 Volkslieder aus der heilen Welt
- 1980 Liederbuch
- 1981 Der Mann mit dem Hut
- 1981 Es kann ja nicht immer so bleiben – Ausgabe BRD
- 1982 He, ik mach di
- 1983 Es kann ja nicht immer so bleiben – Ausgabe DDR
- 1983 Unsre Klingel ist kaputt
- 1985 Idiotenclub
- 1988 Mit der Torte durch die Tür
- 1990 Klammheimliche Hits der frühen Achtziger (compilation)
- 1990 Land in Sicht
- 1994 Wie im Paradies
- 1996 Die Wirrtuosen
- 1999 Loses zum Fest
- 2002 Ach, du meine Goethe
- 2003 Drei Gesellen (compilation)
- 2003 Wir 3
- 2004 Anselm
- 2005 Spielen Sie auch Gitarre?
- 2007 Einmal Canossa und zurück
- 2008 Prost Franz – Trinklieder aus fünf Jahrhunderten
- 2010 Liedertach (together with Iontach)
- 2010 7/8, oder am Stück
- 2010 Lustig, lustig, ihr lieben Brüder
- 2011 Geschenkt
- 2013 Eins, zwei: Drei im Sauseschritt (Liederjan trifft Wilhelm Busch)
- 2015 40 Jahre – Sowieso
- 2018 Ernsthaft locker bleiben
