= Armin Aberle =

German scientist and professor

- Born: 13 December 1960 (age 65); Hausach, Germany
- Education: University of Freiburg (BSc/MSc, PhD)
- Known for: Research on crystalline silicon solar cells (wafer & thin-film)
- Awards: PVSEC Award at PVSEC-32 / WCPEC-8 (Milan) (2022); Hamakawa Award, PVSEC-26, Singapore (2016); Venia legendi (teaching authorisation) for physics, University of Hanover (1999); Alexander von Humboldt Fellowship (Feodor Lynen programme, 1992)
- Scientific career
- Fields: Photovoltaics, solar energy, thin-film solar cells
- Workplaces: National University of Singapore, Solar Energy Research Institute of Singapore (SERIS)

Armin Gerhard Aberle (born 13 December 1960) is a German semiconductor scientist and professor at the National University of Singapore (NUS) in the field of photovoltaics (PV) and solar energy, with particular expertise in thin-film solar cells and crystalline silicon solar cells. He was the Chief Executive Officer and Head of the Solar Energy Research Institute of Singapore (SERIS) at NUS from April 2012 to June 2026. He currently serves as Cluster Director at SERIS.

His publications have received over 21,000 citations (Google Scholar), with an h-index of 70 (Google Scholar) and 56 (Scopus).

== Early life and education ==
Aberle was born in Hausach, Germany. He studied physics at the University of Freiburg, where he obtained his Physicist (BSc/MSc equivalent) degree in February 1988 and his doctorate (Dr. rer. nat.) in Physics in January 1992, awarded summa cum laude. In June 1999, he obtained his Habilitation degree (Dr. rer. nat. habil.) in Physics from the University of Hanover, Germany, along with the venia legendi (teaching authorisation) for physics.

== Career ==
From 1988 to 1991, Aberle was a research scientist and doctoral researcher at the Fraunhofer Institute for Solar Energy Systems (Fraunhofer ISE) in Freiburg, Germany. In 1992, he received an Alexander von Humboldt Foundation Feodor Lynen Postdoctoral Fellowship and joined the Solar PV Centre at the University of New South Wales (UNSW), Australia, where he worked until 1994. He then returned to Germany as Head of the Silicon PV Department at the Institute for Solar Energy Research Hamelin (ISFH) from 1994 to 1998.

In 1998, Aberle joined UNSW as a faculty member in the School of Photovoltaic and Renewable Energy Engineering, later becoming Professor. He led the Thin-Film Silicon Solar Cell Group and was Associate Director and Director of the PV Special Research Centre, Deputy Director of the Special Research Centre for Third Generation Photovoltaics, and Deputy Director of the Australian Research Council Photovoltaics Centre of Excellence.

Aberle joined the National University of Singapore (NUS) in 2008 as a Visiting Professor and Deputy CEO of the Solar Energy Research Institute of Singapore (SERIS). Since 2009, he has been Professor in the Department of Electrical and Computer Engineering at NUS, and from 2012 - 2026 was the Chief Executive Officer and Head of SERIS.

== Research ==
=== Surface passivation of crystalline silicon ===
Aberle's early research focused on the passivation of crystalline silicon solar cell surfaces, a key factor in improving solar-cell conversion efficiency. During appointments at the Fraunhofer Institute for Solar Energy Systems, the University of New South Wales (UNSW), and the Institute for Solar Energy Research Hamelin (ISFH), he investigated field-effect passivation at the silicon–silicon dioxide interface and the use of remote-plasma silicon nitride films for low-temperature surface and bulk passivation.

In 2000, he published the review article Surface passivation of crystalline silicon solar cells in Progress in Photovoltaics, which surveyed surface-passivation techniques developed since the 1970s for laboratory and industrial silicon solar cells. He also authored the monograph Crystalline Silicon Solar Cells: Advanced Surface Passivation and Analysis (1999).

=== Thin-film polycrystalline silicon solar cells ===
At UNSW, Aberle conducted research on thin-film polycrystalline silicon solar cells deposited on glass substrates as a lower-cost alternative to conventional wafer-based solar cells. His work examined aluminium-induced crystallisation (AIC) of amorphous silicon for the production of large-grained polycrystalline silicon films on glass at relatively low temperatures.

His research group developed the ALICIA (Aluminium-Induced Crystallisation and subsequent Ion-Assisted deposition) solar-cell process, which combined AIC-produced seed layers with ion-assisted epitaxial growth. The group also developed an aluminium-induced texturisation (AIT) method for glass superstrates used in polycrystalline silicon thin-film solar cells.

=== Perovskite–silicon tandem solar cells ===
Since 2021, Aberle's research has focused on perovskite–silicon tandem solar cells. At SERIS, his group has worked on full-wafer two-terminal tandem devices, reporting conversion efficiencies exceeding 28% for small-area cells and above 24% for full-wafer devices.

== Awards ==
- 1992 Alexander von Humboldt Fellowship (Feodor Lynen programme)
- 1999 Venia legendi (teaching authorisation) for physics, University of Hanover
- 2008 IAG Eureka Prize for Innovative Solutions to Climate Change
- 2016 Distinguished PV Scientist Award
- 2016 Hamakawa Award, PVSEC-26, Singapore
- 2022 PVSEC Award at PVSEC-32 / WCPEC-8 (Milan)

== See also ==
- Solar cell
- Solar power in Australia
