= Gerd Semmer =

German poet (1919–1967)

Gerhard Friedrich "Gerd" Semmer (December 21, 1919, in Paderborn – November 12, 1967, in Ratingen) was a German poet, columnist, songwriter and translator. He is considered the "father of the German protest song".

== Biography ==
Born in Paderborn in 1919 as the son of a master tailor, Semmer had to interrupt high school to do a tailoring apprenticeship with his father. In 1943 he passed the master craftsman examination in Weimar and the Abitur in Paderborn. Already in his youth he developed an interest in puppetry. The puppet mask became a vehicle for him to express political criticism at an early stage. This passion accompanied him all his life.

From 1943 to 1946 he studied theater studies, art history and German studies in Vienna, after the end of the war, from 1946 on, Romance studies and sociology in Marburg. In 1950 he began a doctoral thesis on Bertolt Brecht, the completion of which was prevented by the unexpected death of the doctoral supervisor Professor Milch and the outbreak of the Cold War. Own literary works initially remained unprinted. In 1951 he got a job as an interpreter in the local Moroccan barracks in Marburg. From 1952 to 1956 he was assistant director and scientific advisor to Erwin Piscator in Marburg, Gießen and Berlin. He worked u. a. participated in the production of Büchner's Dantons Tod, which included his research on the songs of the French Revolution, which he also published in a German adaptation.

In 1953, after starting a family, he moved to Düsseldorf and worked as an editor for the satirical newspaper Der Deutsche Michel. Until 1957 his poems, short prose and book reviews were published there under the pseudonym Moritz Messer. Gerd Semmer was the features editor of the Deutsche Volkszeitung from 1954 to 1956, and from 1957 cultural editor of the weekly newspaper Voice of Peace, which was banned in 1959 for political reasons. In 1957 Semmer founded together with André Müller sen., Erwin Piscator, Günther Weisenborn u. a. the Bertolt Brecht working group . 1961 founded Semmer together with Dieter Süverkrüp, Arno Klönne and Frank Werkmeister the pläne records company in Dusseldorf.

Working with Dieter Süverkrüp, his satirical and political verses resulted in numerous songs and chansons that influenced the West German peace movement. In addition to his own texts, he published numerous translations in Germany, e. B. songs of the European resistance against fascism and French chansons such as Boris Vian's Le déserteur (sung by Dieter Süverkrüp) .

As a pioneer of the German peace marches ("Ostermarsch"), he contributed essential ideas and songs. His last, the evening song at Easter, is "in use" to this day. In memory of "the father of the new German chanson", the literary magazine Kürbiskern dedicated the special edition Songbook to him in 1968 with many of his songs, including all the Easter March songs - some of them set to music by Dieter Süverkrüp - and with poems, protest songs and chansons by Franz Josef Degenhardt, Erich Fried, Fasia Jansen, Rolf Schwendter, Hannes Stütz, Dieter Süverkrüp and others.

Semmer draws on the traditions of Heinrich Heine, Kurt Tucholsky, and Bertolt Brecht, updating them for the specific situation of the Federal Republic in the 1950s and 60s. His work paved the way for various functional/operative forms of literature (operative Literaturformen) that emerged in the literary scene during the 1960s.

== Awards and honors ==
- 1958: Tucholsky-Chanson-Preis of magazin konkret
- 1960: Heinrich-Heine-Preis des Ministeriums für Kultur der DDR

== Major works ==
- Die Engel sind müde. Verse und andere Prosa aus dem Schlaraffenland. 1959.
- Widerworte. Gedichte und Chansons. 1965.
- Geschichten vom Herrn B. (99 Brecht-Anekdoten, mit André Müller sen.), 1967.
- Wir wollen dazu was sagen – Texte für eine andere Republik. editor Udo Achten, 1999, Asso Verlag, ISBN 3-87975-746-1.
- Lesebuch Gerd Semmer. editor Karin Füllner, 2017, Aisthesis Verlag, ISBN 3-8498-1267-7.
- Ça ira! Lieder der Französischen Revolution (I and II) 1962
- Warnung, Rattengift ausgelegt! Kinder & Haustiere fern halten 1962
- Ein Lied – drei vier. Moderne Chansons aus dem Schlaraffenland 1963
- Ostersongs 62/63. Lieder zum Ostermarsch, 1963
- Wir wollen dazu was sagen. Neue Lieder gegen die Bombe, 1964
- Europäische Widerstandslieder gegen den Faschismus, 1965
- Ça ira - Lieder der Französischen Revolution CD re-issue 2015

== Translations ==
- Paul Tillard: Der Puppenspieler von Peking. novel, Progress-Verlag J.Fladung 1957.
- Ça ira! 50 Chansons, Chants, Couplets und Vaudevilles aus der Französischen Revolution 1789–1795., Rütten & Loening 1958.
- Georges Brassens: Texte, Damokles-Verlag 1963.
- Sergio Liberovici, Michele L. Straniero: Pueblo que canta. Lieder aus dem neuen spanischen Widerstand. (including record), Damokles-Verlag 1965.
