= Emma Herwegh =

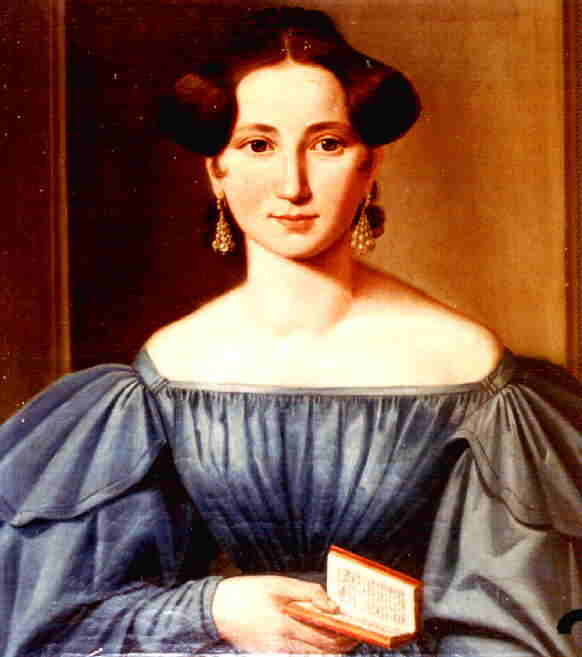
- Emma Herwegh as a young woman Friederike Miethe, ca 1840
- Born: Emma Charlotte Siegmund; 10 May 1817; Magdeburg, Saxony, Prussia, German confederation
- Died: 24 March 1904 (aged 86); Paris, France
- Occupation: revolutionary activist
- Known for: her diaries and the many letters she wrote
- Spouse: Georg Herwegh (1817–1875)
- Children: Horace Herwegh (1843–1901); Camille Herwegh (1847–1848); Ada Virginie Herwegh (1849–1921); Marcel Herwegh (1858–ca.1937)
- Parent(s): Johann Gottfried Siegmund (1792–1865); Henriette Wilhelmine Siegmund (born Cramer)

Emma Charlotte Herwegh (née Siegmund; 10 May 1817 – 24 March 1904) was a German salonnière and woman of letters who participated in the 1848 uprisings, undertaking at least one secret quasi-diplomatic mission on behalf of the German Democratic Legion. She is known to posterity in particular, partly because she married the poet and activist Georg Herwegh, and partly because she was an exceptionally prolific letter writer.

== Life ==
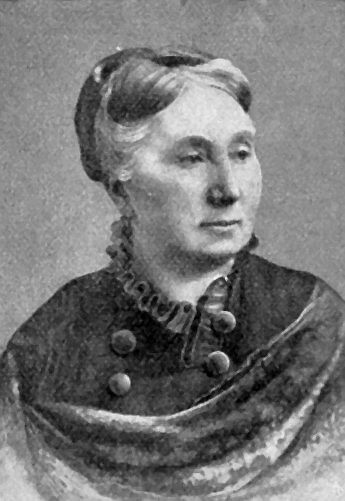
Emma Herwegh as an older woman ca 1900 Die Gartenlaube (Illustriertes Familienblatt), Jahrgang 1904, 2. Beilage zu Nr. 16

=== Provenance and early years ===
Emma Charlotte Siegmund was born in Berlin or, more probably, Magdeburg. Sources differ. Johann Gottfried Siegmund (1792–1865), her father, was a prominent and successful Berlin silk merchant. He came from an old Jewish family, but had himself committed to Protestantism. Emma grew up in a prosperous home: Lucas Schönlein, their family doctor, was also the family doctor of the king, whose palatial city residence was close by.

She was the middle sister of three. There was also a brother, Gustav August Siegmund (1815-1902) who would grow up to become a Berlin physician and minor politician. She enjoyed a first-class education, through which she mastered three foreign languages (French, Polish and Italian). Musically gifted, she composed, painted, translated, enjoyed theater and wrote poetry. Despite the liberal open atmosphere of the parental home, where various prominent Berliners were regular visitors, and despite plenty of animated conversations with friends, the diaries she kept as an adolescent indicate that she felt acutely constrained by the dull and conventional "bourgeois" life which she led:

Mornings nothing, afternoons nothing and evenings not a lot ... Saturday some hours with Valentini [her Italian teacher], dull lesson about a [long since forgotten] play ... Exhausted - evening boat trip - whist party. Ennui. Potato salad.

As a young woman she evinced a certain tomboyishness. A phrase reproduced in several sources indicates that she "often violated the conventions of her time: she rode like the devil, shot with pistol, on holiday in 1841 swam in the sea off Helgoland, smoked, and took an interest in gymnastics". When she was thirteen her political consciousness was engaged by the 1830 French Revolution, and slightly closer to home, two years later, the "Hambach Festival". She also drew inspiration from the Polish liberation movement. Because of her friendship with Emilia Sczaniecka, twelve years her senior, it is evident from their correspondence that she was unusually well informed about the Polish situation in the aftermath of successive partitions of Polish territory between Russia and Prussia. Her sympathies lay with the oppressed population, which meant uncompromising rejection of the Prussian and Russian positions. Even before she met Georg Herwegh she was enthusiastic about another revolution:

I read about French revolutionary history and was seized by a volcanic passion, at once burning, at once half frozen. - But how might it be if the time came when every man thought like a king, when everyone was taught such a level of empowerment that people saw one another only as brothers, where only merit mattered, where divine spirit was revealed in every human heart, to the point where kings were no longer needed?

The death of the king in June 1840 brought the prospect of a new generation of monarch, and many of those who back in 1832 had celebrated visions of liberalism and democracy at Hambach dared to think their moment had arrived. Emma Siegmund did not share their optimism. The new king was crowned on 18 October 1840. She did not need to walk far from the family home to witness the festivities. Her diary comment comprised three words: "Everywhere boring" ("Langeweile über alles"). By this time she was frequently escaping from the middle-class stuffiness of the family home in Berlin by visiting her friend Emilia Sczaniecka whose family estate at Pakosław near Posen became like a second home to her. The two were in several ways - notably politically - kindred spirits, and spent long hours together discussing independence and freedom (for Poland). Around this time Sczaniecka gave Siegmund a ring inscribed, "Poland is still not lost" ("Noch ist Polen nicht verloren"). Emma would wear that ring for the rest of her long life.

=== Georg Herwegh ===
By the time she was 25, both Emma's sisters were or had been married. She was not. That she came from a cultured, socially well connected, and unusually wealthy family was widely recognised in the city. Her diaries, gleefully quoted by a biographer, indicate that the men in her social circle were "time servers, liberal activists and groupies, low life, philistines, pretty boys, weathercocks, donkeys, dropouts, no-hopers and sycophants" ("Beamtenseelen, Menschenware, niederträchtige Gesellschaft, Schufte, Philister, liberales Pack, Schöngeister, Windbeutel, Esel, entmarkte Gesellen, Höflinge, Speichellecker."). She had a powerful crush on the young diplomat, Jean-Jacques Jules Piaget, who married her younger sister, Fanny, and she was devastated when he died suddenly in 1840.

The young revolutionary

Emma Herwegh's revolutionary convictions were evidently well developed by the time she was 21:

Solang dem Adel gehuldigt wird, so lange die Menge sich im gleichen Rang mit dem lieben Vieh stellen wird, so lange muss die Herrschaft dauern. Ich könnte an einem Manne Heftigkeit, ja selbst Zorn dulden, aber ich könnte es nicht ertragen, einen Mann sich beugen zu sehen. Der Mann wie das Weib sollen nur einen Oberherrn anerkennen, vor dem sie sich in den Staub werfen - Gott.

— Emma Siegmund in a letter dated 21 January 1839

While the aristocracy are held in awe, and as long as the masses are ranked with cattle, for so long the overlordship must endure. I could put up with ferocity - even anger - in a man, but I cannot bear to see a man grovel. The man, like the woman, should acknowledge just one overlord, before whom they cast themselves into the dust: God.

On 28 October 1841, Emma Siegmund got her hands on a copy of "Gedichte eines Lebendigen" (loosely "Poems of one who is alive"), a poetry collection by the young Stuttgart poet Georg Herwegh, who was living in political exile in Switzerland. The little volume had been promptly banned by the authorities, despite which (or possibly because of which) it had become a bestseller. Like many of her generation, she found herself fired up by the verses that evoked unity among all people and called for revolution. "That is the answer my soul was missing" ("Das ist die Antwort auf meine Seele!"), she is said to have cried out. Her image of this noble poet became a focus in her diary entries and she set about engineering a meeting with her new "favourite bard". She was in love – albeit platonically at this stage – with a man she had never met.

Siegmund discovered that during the late summer of 1842 Herwegh had planned a celebrity tour of Germany, which would include Berlin. He was looking for people to work on a new project to be centred round a newspaper, "Deutschen Boten aus ser Schweiz" ("German messages from Switzerland"), intended, it has been suggested, to get around the press censorship in Prussia. As he toured the cities he was widely feted. Getting near him was no simple matter. Nevertheless, helped by her friend Charlotte Guticke (who herself later married Max Duncker), Siegmund managed, at an art exhibition, to get close enough to Herwegh to speak with him. That turned into a meal together followed by a succession of increasingly excited daily diary entries. Georg Herwegh and Emma Siegmund became engaged on or before 13 November 1842. During his visit, Herwegh was also given an audience with King Frederick William IV whose curiosity had been aroused. The encounter was more an exchange of views than a meeting of minds. At the end of it the king murmured, "I know we are enemies, but I must be true to my profession, we want to be honest enemies" (""Ich weiß, wir sind Feinde, aber ich muss nun mal bei meinem Handwerk bleiben, wir wollen ehrliche Feinde sein." ") and signaled the end of their meeting. Directly following the audience, he ordered a ban on "Deutschen Boten aus ser Schweiz". The lovers spent Christmas at the Siegmund family home in Berlin. In December 1842, the king became aware that Herwegh had published an open letter complaining about the political situation in Germany, and ordered that the literary trouble maker be expelled from the kingdom. On 26 December 1842, Hervegh was marched to a police station and given 24 hours to leave the country. It was partly as a result of pressure from the government in Vienna but partly, also, as a result of King Frederick William's appreciation of the dangers represented by the popularity of Georg Herwegh, that there was now a more general tightening up of censorship in Prussia and elsewhere in the German confederation.

Herwegh had used his German trip to meet at some length with Heinrich Heine, and as he hastened back to Switzerland he found time to stop off in Leipzig to meet with his friend (and political ally) Mikhail Bakunin who was staying in the city. Emma had not wished to be separated from her fiancé, and the two of them traveled to Leipzig together. At the station, their fellow revolutionary, Bakunin awaited them. However, they were also awaited by a Saxon police officer who served Herwegh with an expulsion order without even permitting him to leave the main railway station. The entire experience appears to have crystallised in Emma a dislike of Prussia which would never leave her. Now the lovers really were parted, and for the next two months their relationship was intensively pursued (and thereby documented) by correspondence.

At the start of February 1843, Emma was informed by a mutual friend, Ludwig Follen, that Herwegh, now back in Zürich, was ill. Friends were convinced that only Emma's presence could save him from further decline. She also became aware that her letters to him, and his to her, were taking a remarkably long time to arrive. Later, she established the reason: the letters were being intercepted and read by government censors not just in Berlin, but also by other governments along the way. She reacted to Follen's information on her fiancé by immediately setting off for Zürich, where she arrived by stage coach, accompanied by her (already a widow for more than five years) elder sister, Minna Caspari, and by her father, on 23 February 1843. Georg Herwegh and Emma Siegmund were married on 8 March 1843 at Baden (Aargau), an hour or so down the valley from Zürich. An official exclusion order from the Canton of Zürich had come into effect sooner than expected, but in the adjacent Canton of Aargau the cantonal president was happy for the marriage to be contracted, noting that he was "delighted, through this authorisation, to be able to demonstrate that there ..[were].. still cantons in Switzerland that had not fallen prey to the spies". Guests attending numbered various German born (and other) political exiles as well as several originally German successful medical men: they included Adolf Ludwig Follen, Friedrich and Caroline Schulz, Jakob Henle, Karl von Pfeufer and, as the couple's groomsman Michail Bakunin.

In April, they took their honey moon in southern France and Italy. There is also mention of a political meeting in Geneva with two "artisan communists" called Weitling and Becker, and of a bathing holiday in Ostend. The couple evidently intended to remain in Switzerland, paying several hundred Swiss francs to the municipality of Augst and several hundred more francs to the cantonal authorities of Basel-Land for the authorisations needed to do so. By the time they died, the investment would probably have appeared worthwhile, but in September 1843 the couple moved to Paris, the city identified in sources as "the waiting room for the [next] revolution", where their first child, Horace, was born three days short of 1844, and where, between 1843 and 1848, Emma became, among other things, a "salonnière" - the hostess of a politically engaged "salon". Regular visitors included Heinrich Heine, George Sand, Victor Hugo, Franz Liszt, the Countess d'Agoult, Ivan Turgenev, Alphonse de Lamartine and Pierre-Jean de Béranger.

During the 1840s, there was growing nervousness on the part of the rulers in central and eastern Europe that they might yet suffer the fate suffered by Louis XVI. There was not the widescale state mandated arrest killing of political opponents that would become mainstream a century later, but in Austria, Prussia and most of the rest of Germany, potential revolutionaries were subjected to growing levels of state surveillance and their publications attracted increasingly effective censorship. By the time the Herweghs arrived there, Paris had become home to approximately 30,000 German political exiles. These included Arnold Ruge as well as Karl and Jenny Marx. Karl Marx and Georg Herwege, both of them newly married writers, closely aligned politically and both new fathers, formed a particular bond, although Emma, again heavily pregnant and hoping to see a little more of her husband, blocked the suggestion from Ruge that the three families should all live together in a "living community" ("Wohngemeinschaft") with shared kitchen facilities. The Herwegh marriage had its stormy periods. In Paris, for a time, Emma found Marie d'Agoult becoming a serious rival for her husbands' affections, and there would later be times when the couple lived apart, but the partnership nevertheless endured.

=== 1848 ===
The long-awaited revolution broke out, in Germany, in March 1848. In his Paris exile Georg Herwegh was still a principal focus of revolutionary awareness. A second volume of "Gedichte eines Lebendigen" (loosely "Poems of one who is alive"), published in 1843 had sharpened up his revolutionary credentials with his target readership. Against the repeated entreaties of his more pragmatic friend and neighbour, Karl Marx, Herwegh hurriedly assembled a small group of armed radicals and marched off to join the small improvised army around Friedrich Hecker in Baden. He was accompanied by his wife, reportedly the only woman in an armed band of 650, whose passion for the enterprise was no less intense than his. For her the coming revolution was a shared struggled, not merely for democracy in Germany, but for the liberation of Poland from the increasingly oppressive tyranny being imposed on "Congress Poland" by Czar Nicholas, who had become a particular hate figure for her. (The czar's mother had been born a princess of Württemberg, less than a day's march from Karlsruhe, the avowed destination of the armed revolutionary group which Georg Herwegh had assembled.)

As the little force from Paris reached Alsace, Emma Herwegh undertook at least one covert mission from Strasbourg across the river to make contact with Hecker's force in order to co-ordinate a coming together of the two forces. In the event, however, Karl Marx's prognosis proved correct. Herwegh's Legion of German democrats arrived in Strasbourg having failed to attract the French government backing that they had hoped for. While the force waited in Strasbourg Emma Herwegh, disguised as a stylishly attired teenage boy and armed with two daggers, successfully made contact with Friedrich Hecker in Baden to find only a lukewarm welcome for the support offered. By the end of April the Hecker uprising had been defeated before any coming together with Herwegh's group could be effected, and on 28 April 1848, near Dossenbach (a little upriver of Basel), Herwegh's force was routed by a company of Württemberg infantry. Despite a reward of 4,000 Gulden being offered for Georg's capture, he and Emma escaped with their lives and, disguised as peasants, fled across the river into Switzerland, heading initially to Geneva. By 1849 they appear to have been back in Paris. Georg Herwegh, whose extremism had been exaggerated in government propaganda, and who never captured the support of the moderate majority among the reformers in the region, found himself widely ridiculed while Emma was disinherited by her father whose business interests in Berlin had, since 1842, been badly affected by his daughter's very public displays of revolutionary passion.

=== Exile ===
Cut off from Siegmund family funding, the Herweghs faced the challenge of supporting themselves at their accustomed level. A solution suggested itself in the form of Alexander Herzen, a fellow revolutionary who still had access to significant funding. The Herweghs and the Herzens moved together to Nice in the early 1850s, sharing a house. However, Herwegh had not taken the precaution of telling his friend that half a year earlier he had embarked on an intense love affair with Natalia, Herzen's wife. The love affair with Natalia broke Georg's friendship with Herzen who threatened to challenge Hervegh to a duel, before relocating to London. Natalia died, together with her newborn child, from tuberculosis in 1852. The affair with Natalia Herzen - much publicised by the enraged Herzen in the radical political circles in which the Herweghs moved - appears to have led to a two-year separation, during which Emma relocated to Genoa. Here she became involved with various patriotic activists, most notably forming a close friendship with Felice Orsini who would later achieve wider notability as a would-be assassin of the French emperor. Some sources imply a romantic attachment between Orsini and Emma Herwegh, but the matter is one in respect of which it becomes impossible to disentangle the factual from the fanciful. She did, in any event, became a steadfast and at times a usefully practical supporter of the patriotic adventurer. In 1854, she organised a false passport in the name of "Tito Celsi" for him. Two years later, with Orsini in jail, she sent him a coat with buttons containing an intoxicant intended for use to put his jailers out of action. When that failed, in March 1856, she conspired with others to smuggle hacksaw blades (hidden in a book) and bed sheets into a Mantua prison cell where Orsini was being held, enabling him to escape custody and the threat of possible execution.

In May 1853, Georg and Emma Herwegh resumed their cohabitation, settling together in Zürich, where Emma again became a "salonnière", and hostess to some of Europe's most high-profile radical intellectuals. An alternative or complementary view is that the Herweghs' Zürich home became a sanctuary for political refugees from all over Europe. Her family resumed financial support, and she also earned money by undertaking translations of works by French, Polish or Italian authors into German. The couple remained in Zürich till 1866 when, following a general political amnesty, they moved to Baden-Baden. not too far from where Georg had grown up. Around the same time the couple's financial situation took a turn for the worse: Emma's inheritance seems finally to have been exhausted, and one reason given for leaving Zürich was the need to get away from people to whom they owed money. They stayed in Baden-Baden till 1875, when Georg Herwegh died from Pneumonia. It was important to the couple that his body should be buried "in republican earth" and it was accordingly returned to the Canton of Basel for burial in the cemetery at Liestal.

=== Paris ===
Emma Herwegh now returned to Paris where she supported herself as a languages tutor and translator. There are indications that she also received some financial support from friends. Although she lived in relative poverty, she was able to move in "intellectual circles". It was in Paris that she died, in March 1904. Her body was buried at Liestal "in free republican earth", beside that of her husband.
