= 2003–04 Grazer AK season =

Grazer AK
2003–04 season
- Manager: Walter Schachner
- Stadium: Arnold Schwarzenegger-Stadium
- Bundesliga: 1st
- ÖFB-Cup: Winners
- UEFA Champions League: Third qualifying round
- UEFA Cup: First round
- Top goalscorer: League: Roland Kollmann (27 goals); All: Roland Kollmann (30 goals)
- Highest home attendance: 15,235
- Lowest home attendance: 4,500
- Average home league attendance: 9,007
- Biggest win: 5–1 v. FC Kärnten (H); 17 August 2003
- Biggest defeat: 1-4 v. Bregenz (A); 23 August 2003

The 2003–04 Grazer AK season was the 55th season of competitive football played by Grazer AK, and their ninth consecutive season in the Austrian Football Bundesliga. They won the Bundesliga and the Austrian Cup, winning the double.

== Squad ==
Squad at end of season

Note: Flags indicate national team as defined under FIFA eligibility rules; some limited exceptions apply. Players may hold more than one non-FIFA nationality.

No.	Pos.	Nation	Player
1	GK	AUT	Andreas Schranz
2	DF	AUT	Gregor Pötscher
4	DF	CRO	Mario Tokić
5	DF	AUT	Anton Ehmann
6	DF	AUT	Dieter Ramusch
7	MF	AUT	Joachim Standfest
8	MF	BIH	Samir Muratović
11	MF	AUT	Martin Amerhauser
13	GK	AUT	Franz Almer
14	MF	CZE	Libor Sionko
15	MF	AUT	David Sencar
17	DF	AUT	Daniel Pirker

No.	Pos.	Nation	Player
18	DF	AUT	Emanuel Pogatetz
19	MF	AUT	Matthias Dollinger
20	MF	AUT	René Aufhauser
21	FW	AUT	Dominic Hassler
22	MF	CRO	Mario Bazina (Note: Bazina was born in Mostar, SFR Yugoslavia (now Bosnia and Herzegovina).)
23	MF	AUT	Gernot Sick
24	DF	AUT	Mario Sonnleitner
25	DF	AUT	Mario Majstorović
26	MF	AUT	Stefan Erkinger
28	FW	AUT	Roland Kollmann
30	GK	AUT	Heinz Lienhart
32	GK	AUT	Jürgen Rindler

=== Transfers ===
Note: Flags indicate national team as defined under FIFA eligibility rules; some limited exceptions apply. Players may hold more than one non-FIFA nationality.

No.	Pos.	Nation	Player
—	DF	AUT	Thomas Lechner (Loaned to Kapfenberger SV)
—	DF	NGA	Albert Yobo (Left for FC Zwolle)

No.	Pos.	Nation	Player
—	MF	AUT	Enrico Kulovits (Left for Skoda Xanthi)
—	MF	AUT	Michael Liendl (Loaned to Kapfenberger SV)
—	FW	GHA	Skelley Adu Tutu (Left for Kapfenberger SV)

== Competitions ==
Win Draw Loss Postponed

=== Overall record ===
Competition	First match	Last match	Starting round	Final position	Record							
Competition	First match	Last match	Starting round	Final position	Pld	W	D	L	GF	GA	GD	Win %
Bundesliga	16 June 2003	20 May 2004	Matchday 1	Winners	36	21	9	6	62	32	+30	58.33
Austrian Cup	23 March 2004	23 May 2004	Third round	Winners	4	4	0	0	11	7	+4	100.00
Champions League	30 July 2003	27 August 2003	Second qualifying round	Third qualifying round	4	2	1	1	9	5	+4	50.00
UEFA Cup	24 September 2003	15 October 2003	First round	First round	2	0	2	0	1	1	+0	0.00
Total					46	27	12	7	83	45	+38	58.70

Source: Competitions

=== Bundesliga ===
==== League table ====
Pos	Team	Pld	W	D	L	GF	GA	GD	Pts	Qualification or relegation
1	Grazer AK (C)	36	21	9	6	62	32	+30	72	Qualification to Champions League third qualifying round
2	Austria Wien	36	21	8	7	63	31	+32	71	Qualification to UEFA Cup second qualifying round
3	Pasching	36	17	12	7	59	41	+18	63	Qualification to UEFA Cup second qualifying round
4	Rapid Wien	36	16	9	11	50	47	+3	57	Qualification to UEFA Cup second qualifying round
5	Bregenz	36	11	12	13	47	58	−11	45	Qualification to Intertoto Cup second round

Source: weltfussball.de (in German)
Rules for classification: 1) points; 2) goal difference; 3) number of goals scored.
(C) Champions

==== Matches ====
16 June 2003 1	Grazer AK	1-0	Admira Wacker Mödling	Arnold Schwarzenegger-Stadion, Graz
19:30	Naumoski 47'	Report		Attendance: 7,576; Referee: Manfred Krassnitzer

23 July 2003 2	Pasching	1-2	Grazer AK	Waldstadion, Pasching
19:30	Rothbauer 63'	Report	Tokic 12'; Pogatetz 62'	Attendance: 2,383; Referee: Richard Kern

2 August 2003 4	Austria Salzburg	1-2	Grazer AK	Stadion Wals-Siezenheim, Salzburg
19:30	Hassler 26'	Report	Kollmann 86', 89'	Attendance: 6,875; Referee: Fritz Stuchlik

17 August 2003 5	Grazer AK	5-1	Kärnten	Arnold Schwarzenegger-Stadion, Graz
19:30	Naumoski 8', 83'; Tokić 51'; Kollmann 55'; Ehmann 71'	Report	Schellander 38'	Attendance: 6,669; Referee: Reto Rutz

23 August 2003 6	Bregenz	4-1	Grazer AK	Casino Stadium, Bregenz
19:00	Berchtold 7'; Aslan 28'; Lawarée 41', 52'	Report	Kollmann 18'	Attendance: 8,200; Referee: Wolfgang Sowa

30 August 2003 7	Grazer AK	1-1	Mattersburg	Arnold Schwarzenegger-Stadion, Graz
19:30	Kollmann 12'	Report	Koziak 25'	Attendance: 7,013; Referee: Thomas Steiner

14 September 2003 9	Rapid Wien	2-1	Grazer AK	Gerhard-Hanappi-Stadion, Vienna
16:30	Vico 50'; Ivanschitz 59'	Report	Kollmann 9'	Attendance: 14,806; Referee: Konrad Plautz

17 September 2003 3	Grazer AK	1-3	Austria Wien	Arnold Schwarzenegger-Stadion, Graz
18:00	Kollmann 65'	Report	Rushfeldt 15', 63'; Gilewicz 71'	Attendance: 6,251; Referee: Thomas Einwaller

21 September 2003 10	Grazer AK	2-0	Rapid Wien	Arnold Schwarzenegger-Stadion, Graz
16:30	Kollmann 37', 76'	Report		Attendance: 7,255; Referee: Bernhard Brugger

27 September 2003 11	Admira Wacker Mödling	1-1	Grazer AK	Bundesstadion Südstadt, Maria Enzersdorf
15:30	Jugović 82'	Report	Kollmann 60'	Attendance: 1,292; Referee: Fritz Stuchlik

1 October 2003 8	Sturm Graz	2-1	Grazer AK	Arnold Schwarzenegger-Stadion, Graz
18:00	Silvestre 40'; Filipović 89'	Report	Bazina 62'	Attendance: 9,234; Referee: Stefan Meßner

4 October 2003 12	Grazer AK	1-1	Pasching	Arnold Schwarzenegger-Stadion, Graz
15:30	Tokić 80'	Report	Pircher 47'	Attendance: 5,499; Referee: Manfred Krassnitzer

19 October 2003 13	Austria Wien	0-1	Grazer AK	Franz Horr Stadium, Vienna
16:30		Report	Kollmann 9'	Attendance: 7,363; Referee: René Rogalla

25 October 2003 14	Grazer AK	1-0	Austria Salzburg	Arnold Schwarzenegger-Stadion, Graz
15:30	Aufhauser 10'	Report		Attendance: 7,052; Referee: Wolfgang Sowa

29 October 2003 15	Kärnten	1-4	Grazer AK	Wörthersee Stadion, Klagenfurt
19:30	Kolviðsson 9'	Report	Kollmann 45', 55', 61'; Akwuegbu 74'	Attendance: 4,147; Referee: Franz Mostböck

2 November 2003 16	Grazer AK	2-0	Bregenz	Arnold Schwarzenegger-Stadion, Graz
16:30	Kollmann 70', 88'	Report		Attendance: 6,774; Referee: Konrad Plautz

8 November 2003 17	Mattersburg	0-0	Grazer AK	Pappelstadion, Mattersburg
15:30		Report		Attendance: 8,214; Referee: Gerald Lehner

23 November 2003 18	Grazer AK	1-0	Sturm Graz	Arnold Schwarzenegger-Stadion, Graz
16:00	Kollmann 81'	Report		Attendance: 15,198; Referee: Fritz Stuchlik

30 November 2003 19	Bregenz	1-0	Grazer AK	Casino Stadium, Bregenz
16:00	Aslan 57'	Report		Attendance: 5,000; Referee: Louis Hofmann

6 December 2003 20	Grazer AK	4-1	Kärnten	Arnold Schwarzenegger-Stadion, Graz
15:30	Bazina 12'; Akwuegbu 13', 40'; Kollmann 86' (pen.)	Report	Hota 29'	Attendance: 7,914; Referee: Thomas Steiner

21 February 2004 21	Mattersburg	1-4	Grazer AK	Pappelstadion, Mattersburg
15:30	Novaković 50'	Report	Kollmann 1', 43'; Ehmann 68'; Ramusch 90'	Attendance: 8,310; Referee: Konrad Plautz

29 February 2004 22	Grazer AK	0-0	Austria Wien	Arnold Schwarzenegger-Stadion, Graz
16:30		Report		Attendance: 11,825; Referee: Guido Wildhaber

7 March 2004 23	Austria Salzburg	1-2	Grazer AK	Stadion Wals-Siezenheim, Salzburg
15:30	Pfeifenberger 31'	Report	Kollmann 40', 88' (pen.)	Attendance: 8,276; Referee: Gerald Lehner

14 March 2004 24	Grazer AK	1-1	Sturm Graz	Arnold Schwarzenegger-Stadion, Graz
16:30	Aufhauser 52'	Report	Haas 34'	Attendance: 12,386; Referee: Wolfgang Sowa

17 March 2004 25	Pasching	3-3	Grazer AK	Waldstadion, Pasching
19:30	Baur 10'; Kiesenebner 24', 90+4'	Report	Aufhauser 54', 78'; Amerhauser 64'	Attendance: 5,688; Referee: Louis Hofmann

20 March 2004 26	Grazer AK	2-1	Admira Wacker Mödling	Arnold Schwarzenegger-Stadion, Graz
15:30	Hassler 17'; Sick 74'	Report	Linz 7'	Attendance: 6,258; Referee: Manfred Krassnitzer

28 March 2004 27	Grazer AK	2-1	Rapid Wien	Arnold Schwarzenegger-Stadion, Graz
16:30	Ehmann 30'; Bazina 86'	Report	Martínez 77'	Attendance: 10,173; Referee: Bernhard Brugger

3 April 2004 28	Rapid Wien	0-4	Grazer AK	Gerhard-Hanappi-Stadion, Vienna
15:30		Report	Bazina 15'; Muratović 58'; Tokić 79' (pen.); Sionko 90'	Attendance: 14,401; Referee: Dietmar Drabek

7 April 2004 29	Grazer AK	1-0	Bregenz	Arnold Schwarzenegger-Stadion, Graz
19:30	Sionko 24'	Report		Attendance: 8,272; Referee: Wolfgang Sowa

14 April 2004 30	Kärnten	0-0	Grazer AK	Wörthersee Stadion, Klagenfurt
19:30		Report		Attendance: 5,356; Referee: Franz Mostböck

17 April 2004 31	Grazer AK	1-0	Mattersburg	Arnold Schwarzenegger-Stadion, Graz
15:30	Aufhauser 29'	Report		Attendance: 9,047; Referee: Manfred Krassnitzer

25 April 2004 32	Austria Wien	1-3	Grazer AK	Franz Horr Stadium, Vienna
16:30	Rushfeldt 89'	Report	Bazina 32'; Kollmann 56'; Amerhauser 79'	Attendance: 10,147; Referee: Urs Meier

1 May 2004 33	Grazer AK	3-0	Austria Salzburg	Arnold Schwarzenegger-Stadion, Graz
15:30	Kollmann 70'; Dollinger 90'; Bazina 90+2'	Report		Attendance: 11,726; Referee: Dietmar Drabek

9 May 2004 34	Sturm Graz	0-2	Grazer AK	Arnold Schwarzenegger-Stadion, Graz
16:30		Report	Kollmann 52'; Bazina 75'	Attendance: 13,569; Referee: Gerald Lehner

15 May 2004 35	Grazer AK	1-1	Pasching	Arnold Schwarzenegger-Stadion, Graz
15:30	Kollmann 22' (pen.)	Report	Kovačević 70'	Attendance: Konrad Plautz; Referee: 15,235

20 May 2004 36	Admira Wacker Mödling	2-1	Grazer AK	Bundesstadion Südstadt, Maria Enzersdorf
17:00	Iwan 53'; Linz 57'	Report	Kollmann 74'	Attendance: 5,985; Referee: Manfred Krassnitzer

=== ÖFB-Cup ===
23 March 2004 Third round	Wacker Tirol	1–2	Grazer AK	Tivoli-Neu, Innsbruck
19:30	Eder 26'	Report	Aufhauser 6'; Sick 42'	Attendance: 7,000; Referee: Thomas Gangl

21 April 2004 Quarter-final	Rapid Wien	1–3	Grazer AK	Gerhard-Hanappi-Stadion, Vienna
19:00	Lawaree 17'	Report	Sick 13'; Ramusch 19'; Bazina 85'	Attendance: 9,200; Referee: Konrad Plautz

4 May 2004 Semi-final	Grazer AK	3–2	SV Ried	Arnold-Schwarzenegger-Stadion, Graz
19:00	Pogatetz 56'; Dollinger 81' (pen.); Sick 88'	Report	Sidibe 32'; Schiemer 82'	Attendance: 4,500; Referee: Louis Hofmann

23 May 2004 Final	Grazer AK	3–3 (a.e.t.) (5–4 p)	Austria Wien	Stadion Wals-Siezenheim, Salzburg
16:30	Bazina 45'; Kollmann 86'; Aufhauser 105'	Report	Gilewicz 28', 99'; Dundee 64'	Attendance: 6,500; Referee: Dietmar Drabek
	Penalties
	Muratović (penalty scored); Standfest (penalty scored); Pogatetz (penalty scored); Kollmann (penalty scored); Milinković (penalty scored)		(penalty scored) Verlaat; (penalty scored) Flögel; (penalty scored) Gilewicz; (penalty scored) Janočko; (penalty missed) Dundee

=== UEFA Champions League ===
==== Second qualifying round ====
30 July 2003 First leg	Tirana (Albania)	1–5	(Austria) Grazer AK	Qemal Stafa Stadium, Tirana
18:00	Xhafa 5'	Report	Bazina 14'; Aufhauser 32'; Naumoski 41', 82'; Standfest 56'	Attendance: 7,200; Referee: Georgios Douros (Greece)

6 August 2003 Second leg	Grazer AK (Austria)	2–1	(Albania) Tirana	Arnold Schwarzenegger-Stadion, Graz
20:30	Sick 16'; Kollmann 75'	Report	Agolli 90+2'	Attendance: 5,090; Referee: Kristinn Jakobsson (Iceland)

==== Third qualifying round ====
12 August 2003 First leg	Grazer AK (Austria)	1–1	(Netherlands) Ajax	Arnold Schwarzenegger-Stadion, Graz
20:30	Pogatetz 56'	Report	Sneijder 76'	Attendance: 12,382; Referee: Massimo De Santis (Italy)

27 August 2003 Second leg	Ajax (Netherlands)	2–1 (a.e.t.)	(Austria) Grazer AK	Amsterdam Arena, Amsterdam
20:30	Ibrahimović 15'; Galásek 103' (pen.)	Report	Kollmann 40'	Attendance: 47,870; Referee: Valentin Ivanov (Russia)

=== UEFA Cup ===
==== First round ====
24 September 2003 First leg	Vålerenga (Norway)	0–0	(Austria) Grazer AK	Ullevaal Stadion, Oslo
18:00		Report		Attendance: 2,594; Referee: Paulius Malžinskas (Lithuania)

15 October 2003 Second leg	Grazer AK (Austria)	1–1	(Norway) Vålerenga	Arnold Schwarzenegger-Stadion, Graz
18:00	Ramusch 32'	Report	Berre 59'	Attendance: 7,464; Referee: Dejan Stanišić (Serbia and Montenegro)
