= 2004–05 Grazer AK season =

Grazer AK
2004–05 season
- Manager: Walter Schachner
- Stadium: Arnold Schwarzenegger-Stadium
- Bundesliga: 2nd
- Austrian Cup: Semi-finals
- Austrian Supercup: Runners-up
- Champions League: Third qualifying round
- UEFA Cup: Round of 32
- Top goalscorer: League: Roland Kollmann (15 goals); All: Roland Kollmann (24 goals)

The 2004–05 Grazer AK season was the 56th season of competitive football played by Grazer AK. AK Grazer finished second in the Austrian Football Bundesliga, one point behind champions Rapid Wien.

== First-team squad ==
Squad at end of season

Note: Flags indicate national team as defined under FIFA eligibility rules; some limited exceptions apply. Players may hold more than one non-FIFA nationality.

No.	Pos.	Nation	Player
1	GK	AUT	Andreas Schranz
2	DF	AUT	Gregor Pötscher
4	DF	CRO	Mario Tokić
5	DF	AUT	Anton Ehmann
6	DF	AUT	Dieter Ramusch
7	MF	AUT	Joachim Standfest
8	MF	BIH	Samir Muratović
9	MF	LVA	Imants Bleidelis
10	FW	BIH	Alen Škoro
11	MF	AUT	Martin Amerhauser
12	FW	AUT	Martin Six
13	GK	AUT	Franz Almer
15	MF	AUT	David Sencar
16	DF	AUT	Dominik Sobl
17	DF	AUT	Daniel Pirker

No.	Pos.	Nation	Player
18	DF	AUT	Emanuel Pogatetz
19	MF	AUT	Matthias Dollinger
20	MF	AUT	René Aufhauser
22	MF	CRO	Mario Bazina (Note: Bazina was born in Mostar, SFR Yugoslavia (now Bosnia and Herzegovina).)
23	MF	AUT	Gernot Sick
24	DF	AUT	Mario Sonnleitner
25	DF	AUT	Mario Majstorović
26	DF	AUT	Gernot Plassnegger
27	DF	AUT	Thomas Lechner
28	FW	AUT	Roland Kollmann
29	MF	AUT	Ralph Spirk
30	GK	AUT	Heinz Lienhart
31	MF	AUT	Zlatko Junuzović (Note: Junuzović was born in Loznica, SFR Yugoslavia (now Serbia).)
32	GK	AUT	Jürgen Rindler
35	DF	GAM	Pa Saikou Kujabi

=== Left club during season ===
Note: Flags indicate national team as defined under FIFA eligibility rules; some limited exceptions apply. Players may hold more than one non-FIFA nationality.

No.	Pos.	Nation	Player
9	FW	MKD	Ilčo Naumoski (to Malatyaspor)
21	FW	AUT	Dominic Hassler (to LASK Linz)

No.	Pos.	Nation	Player
24	MF	AUT	Stefan Erklinger (to Kapfenberg)

== Matches ==
=== Legend ===
Win Draw Loss

=== Austrian Supercup ===
9 July 2004 Final	Grazer AK	1-1 (a.e.t.) (2-4 p)	Austria Wien	Arnold Schwarzenegger-Stadion, Graz
20:30	Kollmann 8'	Report	Pogatetz 54' (o.g.)	Attendance: 7,128; Referee: Thomas Steiner
	Penalties
	Kollmann (penalty scored); Standfest (penalty scored); Tokić (penalty missed); Aufhauser (penalty missed)		Vastić (penalty scored); Wagner (penalty scored); Kiesenebner (penalty scored); Rushfeldt (penalty scored)

=== Bundesliga ===
==== League table ====
Pos	Team	Pld	W	D	L	GF	GA	GD	Pts	Qualification or relegation
1	Rapid Wien (C)	36	21	8	7	67	31	+36	71	Qualification to Champions League second qualifying round
2	Grazer AK	36	21	7	8	58	28	+30	70	Qualification to UEFA Cup second qualifying round
3	Austria Wien	36	19	12	5	64	24	+40	69	Qualification to UEFA Cup second qualifying round
4	Pasching	36	17	9	10	53	48	+5	60	Qualification to UEFA Cup second qualifying round
5	Mattersburg	36	12	9	15	48	58	−10	45	

Source: weltfussball.de (in German)
Rules for classification: 1) points; 2) goal difference; 3) number of goals scored.
(C) Champions

===== Matches =====
13 July 2004 1	Wacker Tirol	1-0	Grazer AK	Tivoli-Neu, Innsbruck
19:30	Koejoe 72'	Report		Attendance: 9,730; Referee: Fritz Stuchlik

21 July 2004 2	Grazer AK	1-0	Austria Salzburg	Arnold Schwarzenegger-Stadion, Graz
19:30	Standfest 79'	Report		Attendance: 7,546; Referee: Thomas Einwaller

31 July 2004 3	Bregenz	1-3	Grazer AK	Casino Stadium, Bregenz
19:30	Schepens 24'	Report	Skoro 16'; Kollmann 35'; Sick 83'	Attendance: 3,800; Referee: Gerald Lehner

6 August 2004 4	Grazer AK	1-0	Sturm Graz	Arnold Schwarzenegger-Stadion, Graz
20:30	Ehmann 4'	Report		Attendance: 13,231; Referee: Dietmar Drabek

14 August 2004 5	Mattersburg	0-1	Grazer AK	Pappelstadion, Mattersburg
19:30		Report	Kollmann 13'	Attendance: 11,576; Referee: Wolfgang Sowa

21 August 2004 6	Grazer AK	2-1	Superfund	Arnold Schwarzenegger-Stadion, Graz
19:30	Kollmann 21'; Sick 35'	Report	Glieder 3'	Attendance: 6,141; Referee: Fritz Stuchlik

28 August 2004 7	Admira Wacker Mödling	2-0	Grazer AK	Bundesstadion Südstadt, Maria Enzersdorf
19:30	Pogatetz 66'; Ortner 75'	Report		Attendance: 1,590; Referee: Gerald Lehner

12 September 2004 8	Grazer AK	0-1	Austria Wien	Arnold Schwarzeneger-Stadion, Graz
15:30		Report	Rushfeldt 75'	Attendance: 10,121; Referee: Dietmar Drabek

19 September 2004 9	Rapid Wien	2-1	Grazer AK	Gerhard Hanappi Stadium, Vienna
15:30	Kienast 7'; Došek 84'	Report	Aufhauser 58'	Attendance: 11,849; Referee: Bernhard Brugger

25 September 2004 10	Grazer AK	2-2	SK Rapid Wien	Arnold Schwarzenegger-Stadion, Graz
18:00	Bazina 22', 58'	Report	Ivanschitz 11'; Martínez 55'	Attendance: 10,841; Referee: Gerald Lehner

3 October 2004 11	Grazer AK	2-1	Wacker Tirol	Arnold Schwarzenegger-Stadion, Graz
15:30	Kollmann 55', 70'	Report	Koejoe 28'	Attendance: 7,376; Referee: Wolfgang Sowa

17 October 2004 12	Austria Salzburg	0-1	Grazer AK	Wals-Siezenheim Stadium, Salzburg
15:30		Report	Sick 10'	Attendance: 8,956; Referee: Manfred Krassnitzer

24 October 2004 13	Grazer AK	3-0	Bregenz	Arnold Schwarzenegger-Stadion, Graz
15:30	Kollmann 22'; Bazina 54'; Aufhauser 88'	Report		Attendance: 6,153; Referee: Wolfgang Falb

27 October 2004 14	Sturm Graz	1-0	Grazer AK	Arnold Schwarzenegger-Stadion, Graz
19:30	Silvestre 36'	Report		Attendance: 8,924; Referee: Bernhard Brugger

30 October 2004 15	Grazer AK	1-1	Mattersburg	Arnold Schwarzenegger-Stadion, Graz
18:00	Škoro 19'	Report	Mörz 65'	Attendance: 6,221; Referee: Thomas Steiner

7 November 2004 16	Superfund	1-2	Grazer AK	Pasching, Pasching
15:30	Ježek 26'	Report	Standfest 3'; Bazina 61'	Attendance: 5,236; Referee: Thomas Einwaller

13 November 2004 17	Grazer AK	0-0	Admira Wacker Mödling	Arnold Schwarzenegger-Stadion, Graz
18:00		Report		Attendance: 6,420; Referee: Louis Hofmann

20 November 2004 18	Austria Wien	0-0	Grazer AK	Franz Horr Stadium, Vienna
18:00		Report		Attendance: 5,204; Referee: Konrad Plautz

28 November 2004 19	Grazer AK	1-2	Superfund	Arnold Schwarzenegger-Stadion, Graz
15:30	Kollmann 21'	Report	Kirchler 12'; Pichlmann 90+2'	Attendance: 7,451; Referee: Carlo Bertolini

4 December 2004 20	Mattersburg	3-1	Grazer AK	Pappelstadion, Mattersburg
20:00	Fuchs 18'; Kühbauer 87'; Fülöp 90+2'	Report	Amerhauser 46'	Attendance: 7,513; Referee: Bernhard Brugger

8 December 2004 21	Grazer AK	5-2	Admira Wacker Mödling	Arnold Schwarzenegger-Stadion, Grazer
18:30	Kollmann 9'; Standfest 22', 85'; Škoro 68', 73'	Report	Janko 87'; Bjelica 90+2'	Attendance: 6,395; Referee: Fritz Stuchlik

27 February 2005 23	Grazer AK	4-0	Sturm Graz	Arnold Schwarzenegger-Stadion, Grazer
15:30	Ertl 14' (o.g.); Bazina 28'; Pogatetz 67'; Škoro 84'	Report		Attendance: 12,543; Referee: Gerald Lehner

5 March 2005 24	Wacker Tirol	1-1	Grazer AK	Tivoli-Neu, Innsbruck
18:30	Mair 90+6'	Report	Kollmann 31'	Attendance: 3,843; Referee: Louis Hofmann

12 March 2005 25	Grazer AK	2-0	Bregenz	Arnold Schwarzenegger-Stadion, Graz
18:30	Bazina 22', 51'	Report		Attendance: 5,630; Referee: Bernhard Brugger

19 March 2005 26	Rapid Wien	1-0	Grazer AK	Gerhard Hanappi Stadium, Vienna
18:30	Lawarée 82'	Report		Attendance: 10,761; Referee: Markus Nobs

2 April 2005 27	Austria Salzburg	0-1	Grazer AK	Wals-Siezenheim Stadium, Salzburg
18:30		Report	Amerhauser 62'	Attendance: 5,778; Referee: Konrad Plautz

9 April 2005 28	Grazer AK	1-0	Austria Salzburg	Arnold Schwarzenegger-Stadion, Graz
18:30	Bazina 90+2'	Report		Attendance: 6,453; Referee: Thomas Steiner

16 April 2005 29	Superfund	0-3	Grazer AK	Waldstadion, Pasching
18:30		Report	Ehmann 18'; Muratović 40'; Kollmann 75'	Attendance: 5,291; Referee: Fritz Stuchlik

23 April 2005 30	Grazer AK	5-1	Mattersburg	Arnold Schwarzenegger-Stadion, Graz
18:30	Standfest 12'; Bazina 15', 84'; Kollmann 62'; Škoro 84'	Report	Schmidt 17'	Attendance: 8,141; Referee: Robert Schörgenhofer

30 April 2005 31	Admira Wacker Mödling	1-4	Grazer AK	Bundesstadion Südstadt, Maria Enzersdorf
18:30	Peraica 73'	Report	Bazina 19', 75', 87'; Standfest 42'	Attendance: 1,121; Referee: Wolfgang Sowa

5 May 2005 22	Austria Wien	0-3	Grazer AK	Franz Horr Stadium, Vienna
15:30		Report	Kollmann 40', 78'; Didulica 62' (o.g.)	Attendance: 7,440; Referee: Dietmar Drabek

8 May 2005 32	Grazer AK	0-0	Austria Wien	Arnold Schwarzenegger-Stadion, Graz
15:30		Report		Attendance: 11,260; Referee: Konrad Plautz

14 May 2005 33	Sturm Graz	1-1	Grazer AK	Arnold Schwarzenegger-Stadion, Graz
18:30	Neukirchner 20'	Report	Ehmann 89'	Attendance: 10,464; Referee: Wolfgang Sowa

21 May 2005 34	Grazer AK	2-1	Wacker Tirol	Arnold Schwarzenegger-Stadion, Graz
18:30	Plassnegger 11'; Bazina 20'	Report	Mader 25'	Attendance: 5,736; Referee: Bernhard Bruger

26 May 2005 35	Bregenz	0-1	Grazer AK	Casino Stadium, Bregenz
18:30		Report	Ehmann 74'	Attendance: 1,500; Referee: Louis Hofmann

29 May 2005 36	Grazer AK	3-1	Rapid Wien	Arnold Schwarzenegger-Stadion, Graz
15:30	Kollmann 15', 67'; Bazina 73'	Report	Martínez 88'	Attendance: 13,471; Referee: Dietmar Drabek

=== Austrian Cup ===
15 March 2005 Round of 16	Kremser SC	1–4	Grazer AK	Krems
19:00	Fleischhacker 7'	Report	Kollmann 57'; Ehmann 60'; Bleidelis 77'; Škoro 90'	Stadium: Sepp-Doll-Stadion; Attendance: 2,500; Referee: Fritz Stuchlik

12 April 2005 Quarter-finals	Austria Lustenau	1–3	Grazer AK	Lustenau
18:30	Laschet 45'	Report	Sick 40'; Aufhauser 64'; Kujabi 90+3'	Stadium: Reichshofstadion; Attendance: 2,500; Referee: Bernhard Brugger

17 May 2005 Semi-finals	Rapid Wien	4–1	Grazer AK	Vienna
19:15	Hofmann 8', 64'; Martínez 90'; Lawarée 90+4'	Report	Ehmann 74'	Stadium: Gerhard Hanappi Stadium; Attendance: 11,100; Referee: Thomas Steiner

=== UEFA Champions League ===
==== Qualifying rounds ====
===== Third qualifying round =====
10 August 2004 First leg	Grazer AK (Austria)	0–2	(England) Liverpool	Graz, Austria
20:45		Report	Gerrard 22', 78'	Stadium: Arnold Schwarzenegger-Stadium; Attendance: 14,600; Referee: Alain Sars (France)

24 August 2004 Second leg	Liverpool (England)	0–1 (2–1 agg.)	(Austria) Grazer AK	Liverpool, England
21:10		Report	Tokić 54'	Stadium: Anfield; Attendance: 42,350; Referee: Luis Medina Cantalejo (Spain)

=== UEFA Cup ===
==== First round ====
16 September 2004 First leg	Grazer AK (Austria)	5–0	(Bulgaria) Litex Lovech	Graz, Austria
19:00	Bazina 14', 51'; Kollmann 39', 43'; Pogatetz 85'	Report		Stadium: Arnold Schwarzenegger-Stadium; Attendance: 7,000; Referee: Tonny Kolbech Poulsen (Denmark)

30 September 2004 Second leg	Litex Lovech (Bulgaria)	1–0 (1–5 agg.)	(Austria) Grazer AK	Lovech, Bulgaria
19:00	Joãozinho 67'	Report		Stadium: Lovech Stadium; Attendance: 1,300; Referee: Romāns Lajuks (Latvia)

==== Group stage ====
The group stage draw was held on 5 October 2004.

Pos	Team	Pld	W	D	L	GF	GA	GD	Pts	Qualification	AZ	AUX	GAK	RAN	AMC
1	(Netherlands) AZ	4	3	0	1	6	3	+3	9	Advance to knockout stage	—	2–0	—	1–0	—
2	(France) Auxerre	4	2	1	1	7	3	+4	7	Advance to knockout stage	—	—	0–0	—	5–1
3	(Austria) GAK	4	2	1	1	5	4	+1	7	Advance to knockout stage	2–0	—	—	—	3–1
4	(Scotland) Rangers	4	2	0	2	8	3	+5	6		—	0–2	3–0	—	—
5	(Poland) Amica Wronki	4	0	0	4	3	16	−13	0		1–3	—	—	0–5	—

Source: RSSSF

21 October 2004 1	Auxerre (France)	0–0	(Austria) Grazer AK	Auxerre, France
20:45 (CET)		Report		Stadium: Stade de l'Abbé-Deschamps; Attendance: 4,000; Referee: Fernando Carmona Méndez (Spain)

4 November 2004 2	Grazer AK (Austria)	3–1	(Poland) Amica Wronki	Graz, Austria
18:45 (CET)	Kollmann 32', 61' (pen.), 72'	Report	Dembiński 27'	Stadium: Arnold Schwarzenegger-Stadium; Attendance: 8,000; Referee: Jouni Hyytiä (Finland)

25 November 2004 3	Rangers (Scotland)	3–0	(Austria) Grazer AK	Glasgow, Scotland
20:45 (CET)	Novo 58'; Arveladze 85'; Namouchi 90+3'	Report		Stadium: Ibrox Stadium; Attendance: 46,450; Referee: Olegário Benquerença (Portugal)

15 December 2004 4	Grazer AK (Austria)	2–0	(Netherlands) AZ	Graz, Austria
20:45 (CET)	Aufhauser 41'; Kollmann 54' (pen.)	Report		Stadium: Arnold Schwarzenegger-Stadium; Attendance: 12,000; Referee: Anton Genov (Bulgaria)

==== Knockout phase ====
===== Round of 32 =====
17 February 2005 First leg	Grazer AK (Austria)	2–2	(England) Middlesbrough	Graz, Austria
18:30 (CET)	Bazina 64'; Kollmann 79'	Report	Zenden 52'; Hasselbaink 66'	Stadium: Arnold Schwarzenegger-Stadium; Attendance: 13,000; Referee: Edo Trivković (Croatia)

24 February 2005 Second leg	Middlesbrough (England)	2–1 (4–3 agg.)	(Austria) Grazer AK	Middlesbrough, England
20:45 (CET)	Morrison 18'; Hasselbaink 60'	Report	Bazina 79'	Stadium: Riverside Stadium; Attendance: 20,370; Referee: Eduardo Iturralde González (Spain)
