= 2003–04 Austrian Cup =

Tournament details
- Country: Austria

Final positions
- Champions: Grazer AK
- Runners-up: Austria Vienna

Tournament statistics
- Top goal scorer(s): Sanel Kuljic, Gernot Sick (3)

The 2003–04 Austrian Cup (German: ÖFB-Cup) was the 70th season of Austria's nationwide football cup competition. It commenced with the matches of the First Round in August 2003 and concluded with the Final on 23 May 2004. The competition was won by Grazer AK after beating Austria Vienna 5–4 on penalties after the match finished 3–3 after extra time Due to Grazer AK qualifying for European competition through winning the Bundesliga, Austria Vienna qualified for the 2004–05 UEFA Cup as cup runners-up.

== First round ==
Team 1	Score	Team 2
26 August 2003
ASK Kottingbrunn	2–0	ASKÖ Klingenbach
FC Blau-Weiß Linz	4–0	BSV Juniors
SV Donau Wien	1–0	SV Markt St. Martin
FC Gratkorn	1–3	FC Lustenau
FC Hard	1–3	ASK Voitsberg
FC Mistelbach	0–1	LASK Linz
FC Puch	2–4	Kapfenberger SV
FC Waidhofen/Ybbs	1–2	SC Untersiebenbrunn
FC Stadlau	2–9	SK Sturm Graz
FPA SV Fortuna 05	0–2	Schwarz-Weiß Bregenz
Grazer AK Amateure	1–2	VfB Admira/Wacker Mödling
Kremser SC	4–0	SPG Reichenau
SC Rheindorf Altach	1–3	TSV Hartberg
SC Schwanenstadt	5–0	SV Langenrohr
SK Treibach/Althofen	0–1 (a.e.t.)	SC Austria Lustenau
SKN St. Pölten	3–1	FC Kufstein
SV Gmundnen	2–1 (a.e.t.)	SV Wörgl
SVG Bleiburg	0–0 (a.e.t.) (4–3 p)	DSV Leoben
TUS FC Arnfels	2–1	SV Schwechat
Union Pettenbach	0–3	FC Wacker Tirol
Union St. Florian	1–2	SV Ried
27 August 2003
VfB Admira/Wacker Mödling Amateure	0–3	SK Rapid Wien
SV Spittal/Drau	0–1	SV Mattersburg
23 September 2003
PSV/Schwarz Weiß Salzburg	0–4	ASKÖ Pasching

== Second round ==
Team 1	Score	Team 2
23 September 2003
SV Donau Wien	0–3	SK Sturm Graz
SVG Bleiburg	0–4	SV Ried
ASK Kottingbrunn	1–3	SV Mattersburg
ASK Voitsberg	0–3	SC Untersiebenbrunn
FC Blau-Weiß Linz	2–2 (a.e.t.) (0–3 p)	VfB Admira/Wacker Mödling
SC Schwanenstadt	2–4 (a.e.t.)	FC Wacker Tirol
SV Gmundnern	0–6	Schwarz-Weiß Bregenz
TSV Hartberg	1–0	Kapfenberger SV
TUS FC Arnfels	3–1	SC Austria Lustenau
24 September 2003
Kremser SC	2–3	SK Rapid Wien
30 September 2003
LASK Linz	0–2	FC Lustenau
12 November 2003
SKN St. Pölten	0–2	ASKÖ Pasching

== Third round ==
Team 1	Score	Team 2
23 March 2004
FC Lustenau	1–1 (a.e.t.) (1–3 p)	Schwarz-Weiß Bregenz
SK Sturm Graz	2–0	ASKÖ Pasching
SV Ried	3–1	SC Untersiebenbrunn
FC Wacker Tirol	1–2	Grazer AK
VfB Admira/Wacker Mödling	0–2	SV Mattersburg
24 March 2004
TSV Hartberg	0–2	FK Austria Wien
10 April 2004
TUS FC Arnfels	0–1	SK Rapid Wien
FC Kärnten	4–0	SV Austria Salzburg

== Quarter-finals ==
10 April 2004	SV Mattersburg	0–0 (a.e.t.) (1–4 p)	FK Austria Wien	Mattersburg
15:30		Report		Stadium: Pappelstadion; Attendance: 10,753; Referee: Stefan Meßner
	Penalties
	Mandreko (penalty missed); Kausich (penalty missed); Mörz (penalty scored)		(penalty scored) Rushfeldt; (penalty scored) Wagner; (penalty scored) Verlaat; (penalty scored) Gilewicz

10 April 2004	SK Sturm Graz	4–0	Schwarz-Weiß Bregenz	Graz
15:30	Bosnar 45'; Rojas 72'; Brunmayr 73'; Dag 90+2'	Report		Stadium: Arnold-Schwarzenegger-Stadion; Attendance: 1,628; Referee: Franz Mostböck

20 April 2004	SV Ried	2–2 (a.e.t.) (3–1 p)	FC Kärnten	Ried im Innkreis
19:00	Kuljic 70', 116'	Report	Bubalo 26'; Kampel 95'	Stadium: Fill Metallbau Stadion; Attendance: 5,000; Referee: Bernhard Brugger
	Penalties
	Kuljic (penalty scored); Lasnik (penalty scored); Nentwich (penalty missed); Cermernjak (penalty scored)		(penalty missed) Akwuegbu; (penalty missed) Hieblinger; (penalty scored) Hota; (penalty missed) Bubalo

21 April 2004	SK Rapid Wien	1–3	Grazer AK	Vienna
19:00	Lawaree 17'	Report	Sick 13'; Ramusch 19'; Bazina 85'	Stadium: Gerhard Hanappi Stadium; Attendance: 9,200; Referee: Konrad Plautz

== Semi-finals ==
4 May 2004	Grazer AK	3–2	SV Ried	Graz
19:00	Pogatetz 56'; Dollinger 81' (pen.); Sick 88'	Report	Sidibe 32'; Schiemer 82'	Stadium: Arnold-Schwarzenegger-Stadion; Attendance: 4,500; Referee: Louis Hofmann

5 May 2004	SK Sturm Graz	1–1 (a.e.t.) (4–5 p)	FK Austria Wien	Graz
18:00	Salmutter 90+3'	Report	Vastić 14'	Stadium: Arnold-Schwarzenegger-Stadion; Attendance: 3,296; Referee: Dietmar Drabek
	Penalties
	Silvestre (penalty scored); Haas (penalty scored); Dag (penalty missed); Salmutter (penalty scored); Filipović (penalty scored); Mujiri (penalty missed)		Verlaat (penalty scored); Flögel (penalty scored); Kitzbichler (penalty scored); Dospel (penalty scored); Blanchard (penalty missed); Gilewicz (penalty scored)

== Final ==
23 May 2004
16:30

Grazer AK	3–3 (a.e.t.)	Austria Wien
Bazina 45'; Kollmann 86'; Aufhauser 105'	Report	Gilewicz 28', 99'; Dundee 64'
Penalties
Muratović (penalty scored); Standfest (penalty scored); Pogatetz (penalty scored); Kollmann (penalty scored); Milinković (penalty scored)	5–4	(penalty scored) Verlaat; (penalty scored) Flögel; (penalty scored) Gilewicz; (penalty scored) Janočko; (penalty missed) Dundee

Stadion Wals-Siezenheim, Salzburg
Attendance: 6,500
Referee: Dietmar Drabek
