= Nigeria national football team results (2000–2009) =

- Win Draw Loss

The Nigeria national football team represents Nigeria in men's international football.

== 2000 ==
23 Jan 2000 2000 Africa Cup of Nations Group D	Nigeria	4–2	Tunisia	Lagos, Nigeria
	Okocha 27' 62'; Ikpeba 68' 74'	Report	Trabelsi 7'; Sellimi 16'	Attendance: 40,000; Referee: Alain Sars (France)

28 January 2000 2000 Africa Cup of Nations Group D	Nigeria	0–0	Congo	Lagos, Nigeria
		Report		Attendance: 30,000; Referee: Felix Tangawarima

3 February 2000 2000 Africa Cup of Nations Group D	Nigeria	2–0	Morocco	Lagos, Nigeria
	Finidi 29'; Aghahowa 82'	Report		Attendance: 60,000; Referee: Mohamed Ali Bujsaim

7 February 2000 2000 AfCoN Quarterfinals	Nigeria	2–1	Senegal	Lagos, Nigeria
	Aghahowa 84' 92'	Report	Fadiga 6'	Attendance: 60,000; Referee: Felix Tangawarima

10 February 2000 2000 AfCoN Semifinals	Nigeria	2–0	South Africa	Surulere, Nigeria
	Babangida 1' 34'	11v11 Report; BBC Report		Stadium: Surulere Stadium; Attendance: 40,000; Referee: Gamal El Ghandour

13 February 2000 2000 AfCoN Final	Nigeria	2–2 (a.e.t.) (3–4 p)	Senegal	Lagos, Nigeria
	Chukwu 45'; Okocha 47'	Report	Eto'o 26'; Mboma 31'	Attendance: 40,000; Referee: Mourad Daami (Tunisia)
	Penalties
	Okocha (penalty scored); Okpara (penalty scored); Kanu (penalty missed); Ikpeba (penalty missed); Oliseh (penalty scored)		(penalty scored) M'Boma; (penalty scored) Wome; (penalty scored) Geremi; (penalty missed) Foé; (penalty scored) Song

9 April 2000 2002 FIFA World Cup qualification	Eritrea	0–0	Nigeria	Asmara, Eritrea
		Report		Stadium: Denden Stadium; Attendance: 3,000; Referee: Ahmed Auda

22 April 2000 2002 FIFA World Cup qualification	Nigeria	4–0	Eritrea	Surulere, Lagos State
	Akwuegbu 13'; Lawal 20'; Akpoborie 65'; Kanu 85' (pen.)	Report		Stadium: Surulere Stadium; Attendance: 3,000; Referee: Duarte Monteiro

4 June 2000 International friendly	Nigeria	3–2	Malawi	Nigeria
	Shuaibu 22'; Gasper 36'; Issah 46'	Report	Chitsulo 64' 90'	Stadium: Sani Abacha Stadium; Attendance: 20,000

6 June 2000 International friendly	Nigeria	4–1	Malawi	Port Harcourt, Nigeria
	Skinn 40'; Adamu 50'; Gasper 73'; Shuaibu 90'	Report	Nkwazi 00'	Stadium: Liberation Stadium; Attendance: 15,000

17 June 2000 2002 FIFA World Cup qualification	Nigeria	2–0	Sierra Leone	Lagos, Nigeria
	Okocha 16'; Akwuegbu 37'	Report		Stadium: National Stadium, Lagos; Attendance: 31,000; Referee: Malick Sillag

9 July 2000 2002 FIFA World Cup qualification	Liberia	2–1	Nigeria	Liberia
	Wreh 4' 48'	Report	Oliseh 49'	Stadium: Samuel Kanyon Doe; Attendance: 45,000; Referee: Hichem Guirat

2 September 2000 2002 African Cup of Nations qualification	Nigeria	4–0	Namibia	Lagos, Nigeria
	Ikpeba 40' 70' 90'; Ojigwe 52'	Report		Attendance: 25,000

7 October 2000 2002 African Cup of Nations qualification	Madagascar	0–0	Nigeria	Cairo, Egypt
		Report		Stadium: Stade Municipal de Mahamasina; Attendance: 7,000

== 2001 ==
13 January 2001 2002 African Cup of Nations qualification	Nigeria	1–0	Zambia	Lagos, Nigeria
	Victor Agali 33'	Report

27 January 2001 2002 FIFA World Cup qualification	Nigeria	3–0	Sudan	Port Harcourt, Nigeria
	Agali 58' 68'; Kanu 79'	Report		Attendance: 30,000; Referee: Gamal Mahmoud Al-Ghandour

10 March 2001 2002 FIFA World Cup qualification	Ghana	0–0	Nigeria	Accra, Ghana
		Report		Stadium: National Sports Council; Attendance: 34,491; Referee: Felix Onias Tangawarima

24 March 2001 2002 African Cup of Nations qualification	Zambia	1–1	Nigeria	Chingola, Zambia
	Okorunowo 42' (o.g.)	Report	Akwuegbu 30'	Attendance: 20,000

21 April 2001 2002 FIFA World Cup qualification	Sierra Leone	2–0	Nigeria	Freetown, Sierra Leone
	Mansaray 1' 25'	Report		Stadium: National Stadium; Attendance: 35,000; Referee: Sharaf Aboubacar

5 May 2001 2002 FIFA World Cup qualification	Nigeria	2–0	Liberia	Port Harcourt, Nigeria
	Kanu 11'; Agali 59'	Report		Stadium: Liberation Stadium; Attendance: 12,000; Referee: An-Yan Lim Kee Chong

2 June 2001 2002 African Cup of Nations qualification	Nigeria	1–0	Madagascar	Benin City, Nigeria
	Akwuegbu 11'	Report

16 June 2001 2002 African Cup of Nations qualification	Namibia	0–2	Nigeria	Namibia
		Report	Yakubu 89'; Shaibu 90'	Stadium: Sam Nujoma Stadium

1 July 2001 2002 FIFA World Cup qualification	Sudan	0–4	Nigeria	Sudan
		Report	Okocha 40'; Yakubu 47' 87'; Aghahowa 78'	Stadium: El Meriekh Stadium; Attendance: 23,100

28 July 2001 2002 FIFA World Cup qualification	Nigeria	3–0	Ghana	Port Harcourt, Nigeria
	Agali 1'; Babangida 18' 32'	Report		Stadium: Liberation Stadium; Attendance: 17,000

13 September 2001 Friendly	South Korea	2–2	Nigeria	Korea Republic
	Lee 66'; Choi 78'	Report	Nduke 8' 38'	Stadium: Daejeon World Cup Stadium; Attendance: 4,000

16 September 2001 Friendly	South Korea	2–1	Nigeria	Korea Republic
	Kim 58' (pen.); Lee 90'	Report	Nduke 62'	Stadium: Busan Asiad Stadium; Attendance: 42,186

7 October 2001 International friendly	Japan	2–2	Nigeria	Southampton, England
15:00 BST (UTC+01)	Yanagisawa 26'; Suzuki 57'	Report	Matsuda 27' (o.g.); Aghahowa 81' Ejiofor (red card) 87'	Stadium: St Mary's Stadium; Attendance: 11,801; Referee: Steve Dunn (England)

== 2002 ==
12 January 2002 Friendly	Ivory Coast	1–1	Nigeria	Bouaké, Côte d'Ivoire
	Traore Kain 24'	Report	Akwuegbu 55'	Stadium: Stade Municipal; Attendance: 60,000

21 January 2002 2002 African Cup of Nations	Algeria	0–1	Nigeria	Bamako, Mali
		Report	Aghahowa 43'	Stadium: Stade du 26 Mars; Attendance: 10,000

24 January 2002 2002 African Cup of Nations	Mali	0–0	Nigeria	Bamako, Mali
		Report		Stadium: Stade du 26 Mars; Attendance: 50,000

28 January 2002 2002 African Cup of Nations	Liberia	0–1	Nigeria	Bamako, Mali
		Report	Aghahowa 63'	Stadium: Stade du 26 Mars; Attendance: 9,000

3 February 2002 2002 African Cup of Nations quarter-final	Nigeria	1–0	Ghana	Bamako, Mali
	Lawal 80'	Report		Stadium: Stade du 26 Mars; Attendance: 25,000

7 February 2002 2002 African Cup of Nations semi-final	Nigeria	1–2	Senegal	Bamako, Mali
	Aghahowa 88'	Report	Diop 54'; Diao 97'	Stadium: Stade du 26 Mars; Attendance: 20,000

9 February 2002 2002 African Cup of Nations 3rd place match	Mali	0–1	Nigeria	Mopti, Mali
		Report	Yakubu 55'	Stadium: Stade Baréma Bocoum

26 March 2002 Friendly	Nigeria	1–1	Paraguay	Shepherd's Bush, London
	Okocha 83'	Report	Gamarra 18'	Stadium: Loftus Road

17 April 2002 Friendly	Scotland	1–2	Nigeria	Pittodrie, Aberdeen
	Dailly 7'	Report	Aghahowa 40', 69'	Stadium: Pittodrie Stadium; Attendance: 20,465

4 May 2002 Friendly	Nigeria	3–0	Kenya	Lagos, Nigeria
	Ojigwe 49'; Opabunmi 55'; Oruma 87'	Report		Stadium: National Stadium

16 May 2002 Friendly	Republic of Ireland	1–2	Nigeria	Dublin, Ireland
	Reid 69'	Report	Aghahowa 13'; Sodje 47'	Stadium: Lansdowne Road; Attendance: 42,652

18 May 2002 Friendly	Nigeria	1–0	Jamaica	Shepherd's Bush, London
	Obiorah 48'	Report		Stadium: Loftus Road; Attendance: 7,000

2 June 2002 2002 FIFA World Cup	Argentina	1–0	Nigeria	Ibaraki Prefecture, Japan
	Batistuta 63'	Report		Stadium: Kashima Soccer Stadium; Attendance: 34,050

7 June 2002 2002 FIFA World Cup	Sweden	2–1	Nigeria	Kobe, Japan
	Larsson 35', 63' (pen.)	Report	Aghahowa 27'	Stadium: Kobe Wing Stadium; Attendance: 36,194

12 June 2002 2002 FIFA World Cup	Nigeria	0–0	England	Osaka, Japan
		Report		Stadium: Osaka Nagai Stadium; Attendance: 44,864

8 September 2002 2004 African Cup of Nations qualification	Angola	0–0	Nigeria	Luanda, Angola
		Report		Stadium: Estadio da Cidadela; Attendance: 10,000

11 September 2002 Friendly	Nigeria	2–0	Tanzania	Lagos, Nigeria
	(Goalscorer records not available) (-), (-)	Report		Stadium: National Stadium

12 October 2002 2004 African Cup of Nations qualification	Nigeria	0–0	Djibouti	Lagos, Nigeria
		Report		Stadium: National Stadium

12 October 2002 Friendly	Senegal	2–2	Nigeria	Dakar, Senegal
	Camara 83'; Brahim Sarr 89'	Report	Ogechukwu 46'; Idahor 48'	Stadium: Stade Léopold Sédar Senghar

20 November 2002 Friendly	Nigeria	0–0	Jamaica	Lagos, Nigeria
		Report		Stadium: National Stadium

25 November 2002 Friendly	Nigeria	1–1	Egypt	Lagos, Nigeria
	Moneke 73'	Report	El-Yamani 26'	Stadium: National Stadium

15 December 2002 Friendly	Ghana	0–1	Nigeria	Accra, Ghana
		Report	Okorunowo 42' (o.g.)	Stadium: Accra Sports Stadium

== 2003 ==
16 February 2003 Friendly	Gambia	0–1	Nigeria	Bakau, Gambia
		Report	Ogechukwu 10'	Stadium: Independence Stadium (Banjul Football Stadium); Attendance: 10,000

23 February 2003 Friendly	Nigeria	0–0	Ghana	Warri, Nigeria
		Report		Stadium: Warri Township Stadium; Attendance: 10,000

29 March 2003 2004 African Cup of Nations qualification	Malawi	0–1	Nigeria	Blantyre, Malawi
		Report	Utaka 10'	Attendance: 60,000

25 May 2003 Friendly	Jamaica	3–2	Nigeria	Kingston, Jamaica
	Lowe 25'; Johnson 40'; Williams 90'	Report	Ugochukwu 66'; Kanu 77'	Stadium: The National Stadium; Attendance: 25,000

30 May 2003 2003 LG Cup Semi-final	Nigeria	3–1	Ghana	Abuja, Nigeria
	Yakubu 49' (pen.), 71'; Enakarhire 82'	Report	Agyema 2'	Stadium: Abuja National Stadium

1 June 2003 2003 LG Cup Final	Nigeria	3–0	Cameroon	Lagos, Nigeria
	Yobo 95'; Yakubu 97'; Yaro Yaro 114'	Report		Stadium: Lagos National Stadium

7 June 2003 2004 African Cup of Nations qualification	Nigeria	4–1	Malawi	Abuja, Nigeria
	Yakubu 10', 17'; Kanu 22', 35'	Report	Kanyenda 7'	Stadium: Abuja National Stadium

11 June 2003 Friendly	Nigeria	0–3	Brazil	Abuja, Nigeria
		Report	Gil 33'; Luis Fabiano 37'; Adriano Gabiru 80'	Stadium: Abuja National Stadium; Attendance: 30,000

21 June 2003 2004 African Cup of Nations qualification	Nigeria	2–2	Angola	Lagos, Nigeria
	Kalu Uche 57'; Odemwingie 62' (pen.)	Report	Figueiredo 9'; Akwá 55'	Stadium: Lagos National Stadium

4 July 2003 2004 African Cup of Nations qualification	Djibouti	0–0	Nigeria	Djibouti
		Report

26 July 2003 Friendly	Nigeria	1–0	Venezuela	Watford, Hertfordshire, England
	Okocha 8'	Report		Stadium: Vicarage Road; Attendance: 1,000

20 August 2003 Friendly	Japan	3–0	Nigeria	Kasumigaoka, Shinjuku, Tokyo, Japan
	Takahara 1', 39'; Endo 72'	Report		Stadium: National Stadium (Tokyo); Attendance: 54,860

== 2004 ==
27 January 2004 2004 African Cup of Nations Group D	Nigeria	0–1	Morocco	Monastir, Tunisia
		Report	Hadji 77'	Stadium: Stade Mustapha Ben Jannet; Attendance: 15,000

31 January 2004 2004 African Cup of Nations Group D	Nigeria	4–0	South Africa	Monastir, Tunisia
	Yobo 5'; Okocha 64' (pen.); Odemwingie 81'; Odemwingie 83'	Report		Stadium: Stade Mustapha Ben Jannet; Attendance: 15,000

4 Feb 2004 2004 African Cup of Nations Group D	Benin	1–2	Nigeria	Sfax, Tunisia
	Latoundji 90'	Report	Lawal 35'; Utaka 76'	Stadium: Stade Taïeb Mhiri; Attendance: 15,000

8 February 2004 2004 Africa Cup of Nations Quarter-final	Cameroon	1–2	Nigeria	Monastir, Tunisia, Tunisia
	Eto'o 42'	Report	Okocha 45'; Utaka 73'	Stadium: Stade Mustapha Ben Jannet; Attendance: 18,000

11 February 2004 2004 Africa Cup of Nations Semi-final	Tunisia	1–1 (a.e.t.) (5–3 p)	Nigeria	Radès, Tunisia
16:00 GMT+1	Badra 82' (pen.)	Report; Report; Highlights	Okocha 67' (pen.)	Stadium: Stade Olympique de Radès; Attendance: 56,000
	Penalties
	Badra (penalty scored) dos Santos (penalty scored); Mhedhebi (penalty scored); Benachour (penalty scored); Haggui (penalty scored)		(penalty scored) Utaka; (penalty missed) Odemwingie; (penalty scored) Yobo; (penalty scored) Udeze

13 February 2004 2004 Africa Cup of Nations 3rd place	Nigeria	2–1	Mali	Monastir, Tunisia
	Okocha 17'; Odemwingie 47'	Report	Abouta 47'	Stadium: Stade Mustapha Ben Jannet; Attendance: 2,500

29 May 2004 Unity Cup	Nigeria	3–0	Republic of Ireland	London, United Kingdom
	Ogbeche 36' 69'; Martins 49'	Report		Stadium: The Valley; Attendance: 7,438

31 May 2004 Unity Cup	Jamaica	0–2	Nigeria	London, United Kingdom
		Report	Utaka 18'; Ogbeche 55'	Stadium: The Valley

5 Jun 2004 2006 FIFA World Cup qualification – CAF Group 4	Nigeria	2–0	Rwanda	Abuja, Nigeria
16:00	Martins 55' 88'	Report; Report		Stadium: National Stadium (Abuja); Attendance: 35,000; Referee: Lassina Paré (Burkina Faso)

20 June 2004 2006 FIFA World Cup qualification – CAF Group 4	Angola	1–0	Nigeria	Luanda, Angola
15:30	Akwá 84'	Report; Report		Stadium: Estádio da Cidadela, Attendance: 40,000; Referee: Aaron Nkole (Zambia)

3 Jul 2004 2006 FIFA World Cup qualification – CAF Group 4	Nigeria	1–0	Algeria	Abuja, Nigeria
16:00	Yobo 84'	Report; Report		Stadium: National Stadium (Abuja); Attendance: 35,000; Referee: Ladoual Hisseine (Chad)

5 Sep 2004 2006 FIFA World Cup qualification – CAF Group 4	Zimbabwe	0–3	Nigeria	Harare, Zimbabwe
15:00		Report; Report	Aghahowa 3'; Enakarhire 28'; Yakubu 48' (pen.)	Stadium: National Sports Stadium (Zimbabwe), Attendance: 60,000; Referee: Joseph Mandzioukouta (Congo)

9 October 2004 2006 FIFA World Cup qualification – CAF Group 4	Gabon	1–1	Nigeria	Libreville, Gabon
16:30	Issiémou 29'	Report; Report	Yakubu 50'	Stadium: Stade Omar Bongo; Attendance: 26,000; Referee: Koudougou Yameogo (Burkina Faso)

11 October 2004 LG Cup Semi-final	Libya	2–1	Nigeria	Tripoli, Libya
	Kara 23' 44'	Report; Report; Story	Ejezi 17'	Stadium: 11 June Stadium

17 November 2004 Nelson Mandela Challenge Cup	South Africa	2–1	Nigeria	Johannesburg, South Africa
	Bartlett 22'; Vilakazi 60'	Report; Story	Makinwa 61'	Stadium: Ellis Park Stadium; Attendance: 29,817

== 2005 ==
26 March 2005 2006 FIFA World Cup qualification – CAF Group 4	Nigeria	2–0	Gabon	Port Harcourt, Nigeria
19:00	Aghahowa 79'; Kanu 81'	Report; Report		Stadium: Liberation Stadium; Attendance: 16,489; Referee: Jean-Marie Hicuburundi (Burundi

5 June 2005 2006 FIFA World Cup qualification – CAF Group 4	Rwanda	1–1	Nigeria	Kigali, Rwanda
16:00	Gatete 53'	Report; Report	Martins 78'	Stadium: Stade Amahoro; Attendance: 30,000; Referee: Kubrom Kidane (Eritrea)

18 June 2005 2006 FIFA World Cup qualification – CAF Group 4	Nigeria	1–1	Angola	Kano, Nigeria
16:00	Okocha 5'	Report; Report	Figueiredo 60'	Stadium: Sani Abacha Stadium; Attendance: 17,000; Referee: Jean-Marie Hicuburundi (Burundi)

17 August 2005 Friendly	Libya	0–1	Nigeria	Tripoli, Libya
		Report	Martins 0'	Stadium: Stade 11 June

4 September 2005 2006 FIFA World Cup qualification – CAF Group 4	Algeria	2–5	Nigeria	Oran, Algeria
20:30	Yacef 48'; Boutabout 58'	Report; Report	Martins 20' (pen.) 88' 90'; Utaka 42'; Obodo 81'	Stadium: Stade Ahmed Zabana; Attendance: 11,000; Referee: Abdullhakim Shelmani (Libya)

8 October 2005 2006 FIFA World Cup qualification – CAF Group 4	Nigeria	5–1	Zimbabwe	Abuja, Nigeria
15:00	Martins 35' 75' (pen.); Yussuf 62'; Kanu 80' (pen.); Odemwingie 89'	Report; Report	Benjani 70'	Stadium: Abuja Stadium; Attendance: 45,000; Referee: Lassina Paré (Burkina Faso)

16 November 2005 Friendly	Romania	3–0	Nigeria	Bucharest, Romania
	Niculae 17'; Petre 49'; Roșu 89'	Report		Stadium: Stadionul Steaua; Attendance: 500; Referee: Veasceslav Banari (Moldova)

== 2006 ==
23 January 2006 2006 AFCON	Ghana	0–1	Nigeria	Port Said Stadium, Port Said
			Taiwo 86'	Attendance: 20,000; Referee: Essam Abdel Fatah (Egypt)

27 January 2006 2006 AFCON	Nigeria	2–0	Zimbabwe	Port Said Stadium, Port Said
	Obodo 57'; Mikel 61'			Attendance: 10,000; Referee: Koman Coulibaly (Mali)

31 January 2006 2006 AFCON	Nigeria	2–1	Senegal	Port Said Stadium, Port Said
	Martins 79' 88'		Camara 59'	Attendance: 17,000; Referee: Jerome Damon (South Africa)

4 February 2006 2006 AFCON	Tunisia	1–1	Nigeria	Port Said Stadium, Port Said
	Hagui 49'		Obinna 6'	Attendance: 17,000; Referee: Eddy Maillet (Seychelles)

7 February 2006 2006 AFCON	Ivory Coast	1–0	Nigeria	Harras El-Hedoud Stadium, Alexandria
	Drogba 47'			Attendance: 21,000; Referee: Jerome Damon (South Africa)

9 February 2006 2006 AFCON	Nigeria	1–0	Senegal	Cairo Military Academy Stadium, Cairo
	Lawal 79'			Attendance: 11,354; Referee: Koman Coulibaly (Mali)

2 September 2006 2008 ACNQ	Nigeria	2–0	Niger	Abuja Stadium, Abuja
	Yakubu 27'; Obodo 60'

8 October 2006 2008 ACNQ	Lesotho	0–1	Nigeria	Setsoto Stadium, Maseru
			Yakubu 50'

== 2007 ==
6 February 2007 Friendly	Ghana	4–1	Nigeria	Griffin Park, London
	Laryea Kingston 50'; Sulley Muntari 53'; Junior Agogo 60'; Joetex Frimpong 74'	Report	Taye Taiwo 65'	Attendance: 18,000; Referee: Iain Brines (Scotland)

24 March 2007 2008 AFCON Qualification	Nigeria	1–0	Uganda	MKO Abiola Stadium, Abeokuta
	Nwankwo Kanu 73'	[ Report]		Referee: Diatta Anjori (Senegal)

27 May 2007 Friendly	Kenya	0–1	Nigeria	Moi International Sports Centre, Nairobi
		[ Report]	Chukwuma Akabueze 41'

2 June 2007 2008 AFCON Qualification	Uganda	2–1	Nigeria	Nelson Mandela National Stadium, Kampala
	David Obua 52' (pen.); Ibrahim Sekagya 65' (pen.)	Report	John Utaka 25'	Referee: Essam Abd El Fatah (Egypt)

17 June 2007 2008 AFCON Qualification	Niger	1–3	Nigeria	Général Seyni Kountché Stadion, Niamey
	Daouda Kamilou 68'	Report	Nwankwo Kanu 40'; Taye Taiwo 70'; Yakubu 89'

22 August 2007 Friendly	North Macedonia	0–0	Nigeria	Stadion Gradski, Skopje
		Report		Attendance: 5,000; Referee: Bas Nijhuis (Netherlands)

8 September 2007 2008 AFCON Qualification	Nigeria	2–0	Lesotho	Warri Township Stadium, Warri
	Stephen Makinwa 42'; Ikechukwu Uche 73'	Report

14 October 2007 Friendly	Mexico	2–2	Nigeria	Estadio Olímpico Benito Juárez, Ciudad Juárez, Mexico
	Cacho 54', 68' (pen.)	Report	Martins 32', 52'	Referee: Elmar Rodas (Guatemala)

17 November 2007 Friendly	Nigeria	0–1	Australia	Craven Cottage, London
		Report	David Carney 52'	Attendance: 11,953; Referee: Mark Clattenburg (England)

20 November 2007 Friendly	Switzerland	0–1	Nigeria	Letzigrund, Zürich
		Report	Taye Taiwo 79'	Attendance: 12,700; Referee: Ivan Bobek (Croatia)

== 2008 ==
9 January 2008 Friendly	Sudan	0–2	Nigeria	MNPS Field, Estepona, Spain
		Report	I. Uche (2H); Ishiaku (2H)

21 January 2008 2008 Africa Cup of Nations	Nigeria	0–1	Ivory Coast	Sekondi Stadium, Sekondi-Takoradi
17:00			Kalou 66'	Attendance: 16,000; Referee: Mohamed Benouza (Algeria)

25 January 2008 2008 Africa Cup of Nations	Nigeria	0–0	Mali	Sekondi Stadium, Sekondi-Takoradi
19:30				Attendance: 16,000; Referee: Abderrahim El Arjoun (Morocco)

29 January 2008 2008 Africa Cup of Nations	Nigeria	2–0	Benin	Sekondi Stadium, Sekondi-Takoradi
17:00	Mikel 53'; Yakubu 86'			Attendance: 4,000; Referee: Kacem Bennaceur (Tunisia)

3 February 2008 2008 Africa Cup of Nations	Ghana	2–1	Nigeria	Ohene Djan Stadium, Accra
17:00	Essien 45+2'; Agogo 83'		Yakubu 35' (pen.)	Attendance: 45,000; Referee: Mohamed Benouza (Algeria)

27 May 2008 Friendly	Austria	1–1	Nigeria	UPC-Arena, Graz, Austria
20:30 UTC+1	Kienast 13'		K. Uche 19'	Attendance: 15,000; Referee: Serge Gumienny (Belgium)

1 June 2008 2010 WC/AFCON Qualifier	Nigeria	2–0	South Africa	Abuja Stadium, Abuja
16:00 UTC+1	I. Uche 10'; Nwaneri 45+1'	Report		Attendance: 50,000; Referee: Koman Coulibaly (Mali)

7 June 2008 2010 WC/AFCON Qualifier	Sierra Leone	0–1	Nigeria	National Stadium, Freetown
14:30 UTC+0		Report	Yobo 88'	Attendance: 25,000; Referee: Sam Korti (Liberia)

15 June 2008 2010 WC/AFCON Qualifier	Equatorial Guinea	0–1	Nigeria	Estadio de Malabo, Malabo
15:30 UTC+1		Report	Yobo 5'	Attendance: 15,200; Referee: John Mendy (Gambia)

21 June 2008 2010 WC/AFCON Qualifier	Nigeria	2–0	Equatorial Guinea	Abuja Stadium, Abuja
16:00 UTC+1	Yakubu 45'; I. Uche 84'	Report		Attendance: 20,000; Referee: Jamel Ambaya (Libya)

6 September 2008 2010 WC/AFCON Qualifier	South Africa	0–1	Nigeria	Telkom Park, Port Elizabeth
15:00 UTC+2		Report	I. Uche 71'	Attendance: 25,000; Referee: Verson Lwanja (Malawi)

11 October 2008 2010 WC/AFCON Qualifier	Nigeria	4–1	Sierra Leone	Abuja Stadium, Abuja
16:00 UTC+1	Obodo 21'; Obinna 35'; Odemwingie 45'; Odiah 51'	Report	Yobo 32' (o.g.)	Attendance: 20,000; Referee: Wellington Kaoma (Zambia)

19 November 2008 Friendly	Colombia	1–0	Nigeria	Estadio Deportivo Cali, Cali, Colombia
	Falcao 82'			Attendance: 10,000; Referee: Albert Duarte (Colombia)

== 2009 ==
11 February 2009 Friendly	Nigeria	0–0	Jamaica	The Den, London
		Report		Attendance: 5,000; Referee: Mike Dean (England)

29 March 2009 2010 WCQ	Mozambique	0–0	Nigeria	Estádio da Machava, Maputo
15:00 UTC+2		Report		Attendance: 35,000; Referee: Amanuel Eyob (Eritrea)

29 May 2009 Friendly	Nigeria	1–1	Republic of Ireland	Craven Cottage, London
20:00 UTC+1	Eneramo 30'	Report	Keane 38'	Attendance: 11,263; Referee: William Collum (Scotland)

2 June 2009 Friendly	France	0–1	Nigeria	Stade Geoffroy-Guichard, Saint-Etienne
20:00 UTC+1		Report	Akpala 32'	Referee: Matthew Dyer (South Africa)

7 June 2009 2010 WCQ	Nigeria	3–0	Kenya	Abuja Stadium, Abuja
17:00 UTC+1	I. Uche 2'; Obinna 72' (pen.), 77'	Report		Attendance: 60,000; Referee: Abdellah El Achiri (Morocco)

20 June 2009 2010 WCQ	Tunisia	0–0	Nigeria	Stade 7 November, Radès
19:10 UTC+1		Report		Attendance: 45,000; Referee: Koman Coulibaly (Mali)

6 September 2009 2010 WCQ	Nigeria	2–2	Tunisia	Abuja Stadium, Abuja
17:00 UTC+1	Odemwingie 23'; Eneramo 80'	Report	Taïder 24'; Darragi 89'	Attendance: 52,000; Referee: Daniel Bennett (South Africa)

11 October 2009 2010 WCQ	Nigeria	1–0	Mozambique	Abuja Stadium, Abuja
17:00 UTC+1	Obinna 90+3'	Report		Attendance: 13,000; Referee: Khalid Abdel Rahman (Sudan)

14 November 2009 2010 WCQ	Kenya	2–3	Nigeria	Nyayo National Stadium, Nairobi
16:00 UTC+3	Oliech 15'; Wanga 77'	Report	Martins 60', 81'; Yakubu 64'	Attendance: 20,000; Referee: Eddy Maillet (Seychelles)
