= Božo Kovačević =

Božo Kovačević may refer to:

- Božo Kovačević (footballer) (born 1979), footballer in Austria
- Božo Kovačević (politician) (born 1955), Croatian politician and diplomat
