= Samir Muratović =

Bosnian footballer (born 1976)

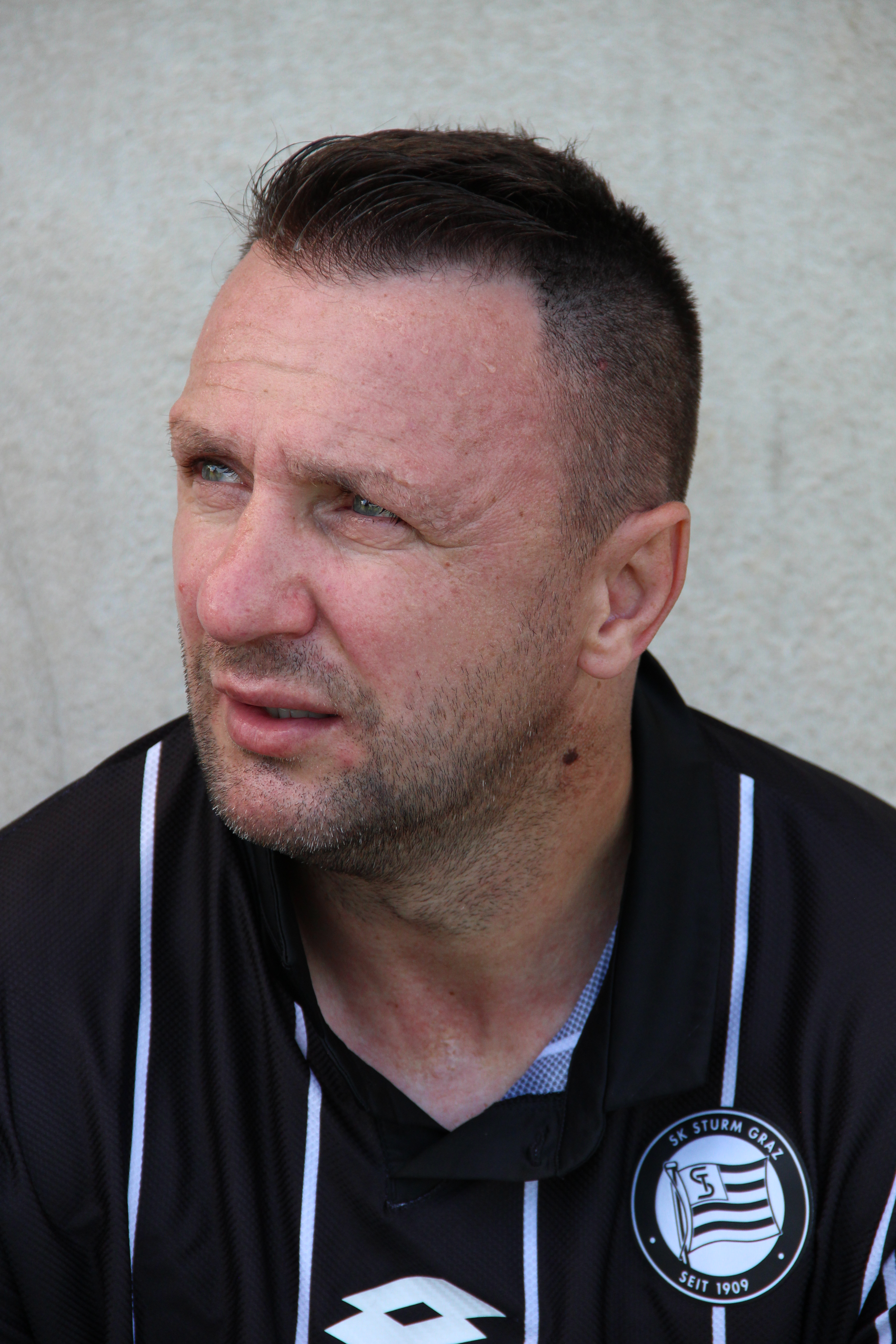
- Muratović as Sturm Graz head scout in 2018

Personal information
- Date of birth: 25 February 1976 (age 50)
- Place of birth: Zvornik, SFR Yugoslavia
- Height: 1.85 m (6 ft 1 in)
- Position: Attacking midfielder

Team information
- Current team: Bosnia and Herzegovina U21 (assistant)

Youth career
- –1995: Drina Zvornik

Senior career*
Years	Team	Apps	(Gls)
1995–1998	Drina Zvornik		
1998–1999	Kocaelispor	27	(4)
1999–2000	Željezničar	53	(36)
2000–2001	Chemnitzer FC	6	(1)
2001–2003	Saturn Ramenskoye	68	(11)
2004–2007	Grazer AK	104	(5)
2007–2012	Sturm Graz	128	(31)
2012–2013	Gratkorn	24	(3)

International career
1999–2014	Bosnia and Herzegovina	24	(0)

Managerial career
- 2012–2013: Gratkorn (assistant)
- 2017–2019: Sturm Graz (head scout)
- 2023: Bosnia and Herzegovina (assistant)
- 2024–: Bosnia and Herzegovina U21 (assistant)
- * Club domestic league appearances and goals

Samir Muratović (born 25 February 1976) is a Bosnian football coach, executive and former player who is currently an assistant coach for the Bosnia and Herzegovina national U21 team.

After finishing his playing career, Muratović spent more than two years as head scout of Austrian Bundesliga club Sturm Graz from 2017 to 2019. He also worked as sporting director of Bosnian side Tuzla City on two occasions.

== Club career ==
Muratović started his career at Drina Zvornik. He then moved to Turkey for Kocaelispor. In 1999, he moved back to Bosnia and Herzegovina and signed with Željezničar of the First League of Bosnia and Herzegovina. Muratović then had a short spell at Chemnitzer FC and then moved to Russian Premier League club Saturn Ramenskoye.

In January 2004, he moved to Grazer AK, until summer 2007, when the club was relegated.

From 2007 to 2012, he played for Sturm Graz. In 2012, he moved to Gratkorn. In 2013, Muratović left Gratkorn and shortly after ended his playing career.

== International career ==
He made his debut for Bosnia and Herzegovina in a January 1999 friendly match away against Malta and has earned a total of 24 caps, scoring no goals. On 5 March 2014, he played his last match for the national team in a friendly match against Egypt at Tivoli-Neu in Innsbruck, Austria.

== Administrative career ==
On 3 July 2017, Muratović became the new head scout of his former club, Sturm Graz. He left Sturm in September 2019, after more than two years of him being the head scout of Sturm.

On 29 May 2019, he was named new sporting director of Bosnian Premier League club Tuzla City. Muratović terminated his contract with the club on 15 December 2020.

== Honours ==
=== Player ===
Željezničar

- Bosnian Cup: 1999–2000

Grazer

- Austrian Bundesliga: 2003–04
- Austrian Cup: 2003–04

Sturm Graz

- Austrian Bundesliga: 2010–11
- Austrian Cup: 2009–10
- UEFA Intertoto Cup: 2008 (Joint Winner)
