= Mario Bazina =

Croatian footballer

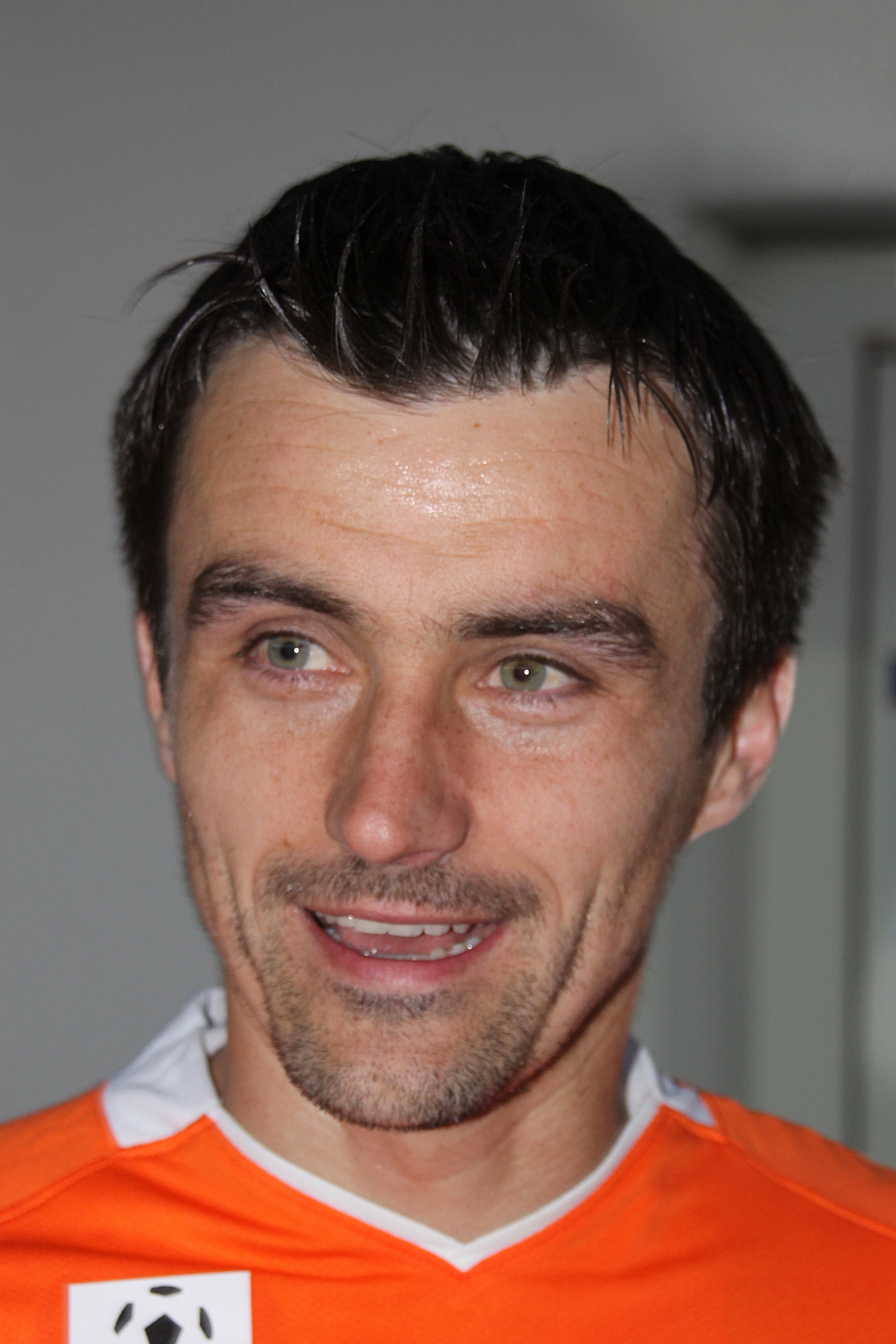
- Bazina in 2009

Personal information
- Date of birth: 8 September 1975 (age 51)
- Place of birth: Lištica, SFR Yugoslavia
- Height: 1.77 m (5 ft 10 in)
- Position: Midfielder

Youth career
- 1989: Široki Brijeg
- 1989–1992: Velež Mostar
- 1992–1995: Hajduk Split

Senior career*
Years	Team	Apps	(Gls)
1995–2000	Hrvatski Dragovoljac	89	(25)
2000–2001	Dinamo Zagreb	31	(3)
2001–2006	Grazer AK	150	(42)
2006–2008	Rapid Wien	72	(18)
2008–2009	Austria Wien	33	(9)
Total		375	(98)

International career
1995	Croatia U20	1	(0)
1997	Croatia U21	6	(1)
2002	Croatia	1	(0)
- * Club domestic league appearances and goals

Mario Bazina (born 8 September 1975) is a Croatian former professional footballer who played as a midfielder.

== Club career ==
Bazina played for Austrian club, Grazer AK for five years and one year with Rapid Wien and for Croatian sides Hrvatski Dragovoljac and Dinamo Zagreb. He was the Croatian First League's player of the year for the 1998–99 season and the Austrian footballer of the year for 2005. He last played as an attacking midfielder for Austria Wien in the Austrian Bundesliga having signed with the club until 2009.

== International career ==
Bazina made his debut for the Croatia national team in an August 2002 friendly match against Wales, coming on as a second half substitute for Milan Rapaić. It remained his sole international appearance.

== Honours ==
Dinamo Zagreb

- Croatian Cup: 2000–01

Grazer AK

- Austrian Bundesliga: 2003–04
- Austrian Cup: 2000–01, 2003–04
- Austrian Supercup: 2002

Rapid Wien

- Austrian Bundesliga: 2007–08
- UEFA Intertoto Cup: 2007

Austria Wien

- Austrian Cup: 2008–09

Individual

- SN Yellow Shirt: 1998
- Austrian Footballer of the Year: 2005
