= Stefan Erkinger =

Austrian footballer

Personal information
- Full name: Stefan Erkinger
- Date of birth: September 1, 1981 (age 45)
- Place of birth: Graz, Austria
- Height: 1.82 m (5 ft 11 1/2 in)
- Position: Midfielder

Team information
- Current team: Austria Klagenfurt

Senior career*
Years	Team	Apps	(Gls)
2001–2002	FC Nußdorf/Debant	?	(?)
2002–2005	Grazer AK		
2005	→ Kapfenberg (loan)	6	(1)
2005–2012	Kapfenberg	152	(5)
2012–	Austria Klagenfurt		
- * Club domestic league appearances and goals as of May 25, 2012

Stefan Erkinger (born September 1, 1981) is an Austrian professional association football player currently playing for SK Austria Klagenfurt. He plays as a midfielder.
