= Klaus Salmutter =

Austrian footballer

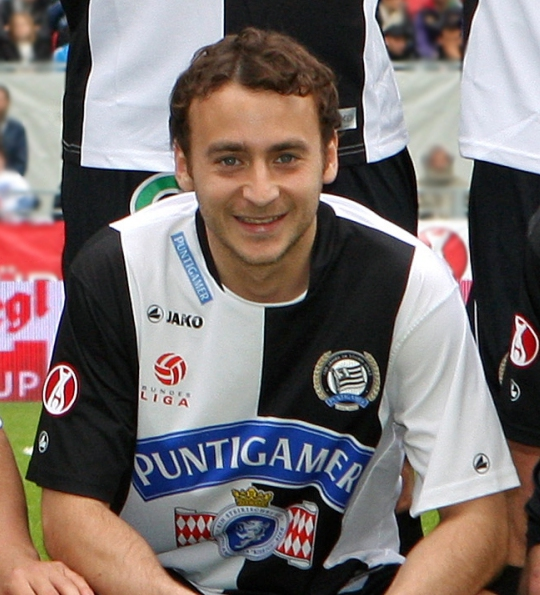

Personal information
- Full name: Klaus Salmutter
- Date of birth: January 3, 1984 (age 42)
- Place of birth: Graz, Austria
- Height: 1.78 m (5 ft 10 in)
- Position: Midfielder

Youth career
- SK Sturm Graz
- Schalke 04

Senior career*
Years	Team	Apps	(Gls)
2003–2008	SK Sturm Graz	97	(13)
2008–2010	LASK Linz	24	(0)
2010–2011	SK Sturm Graz	23	(3)
2015–2016	FC Gleisdorf 09	20	(4)

International career
2006–2007	Austria	4	(0)
- * Club domestic league appearances and goals

Klaus Salmutter (born January 3, 1984) is a former Austrian football player who played as a midfielder.

== Club career ==
Born in Graz, Salmutter played 5 years for hometown club Sturm Graz before joining LASK Linz on free transfer in summer 2008.

== International career ==
He made his debut for Austria in November 2006 against Trinidad & Tobago and has earned 4 caps (no goals) until August 2008.
