= Boško Peraica =

Bosnian footballer

Personal information
- Date of birth: 7 December 1977 (age 48)
- Place of birth: Livno, SFR Yugoslavia
- Height: 1.85 m (6 ft 1 in)
- Position: Forward

Senior career*
Years	Team	Apps	(Gls)
1998–2002	Troglav Livno		
2002–2004	Cibalia	10+	(0+)
2004–2005	Admira Wacker	29	(3)
2005	Olimpik Baku	3	(0)
2006	Posušje	25	(7)
2007	Međimurje	30	(6)
2008	Zrinjski	11	(2)
2008	Vinogradar		
2009–2010	Široki Brijeg	18	(2)
2011	Dinara		
2011–2013	Troglav Livno		
- * Club domestic league appearances and goals

Boško Peraica (born 7 December 1977) is a Bosnian football striker who retired in 2014.
