= Pascal Ojigwe =

Nigerian footballer (born 1976)

Personal information
- Full name: Pascal Karibe Ojigwe
- Date of birth: 11 December 1976 (age 49)
- Place of birth: Aba, Nigeria
- Height: 1.76 m (5 ft 9 in)
- Positions: Defender; defensive midfielder

Senior career*
Years	Team	Apps	(Gls)
1993–1995	Enyimba		
1995–2000	1. FC Kaiserslautern	6	(0)
1995–1999	1. FC Kaiserslautern II	62	(4)
1999–2000	→ 1. FC Köln (loan)	32	(2)
2000–2003	Bayer Leverkusen	30	(0)
2003–2004	Borussia Mönchengladbach	7	(0)
2004–2006	1860 Munich	1	(0)
2006–2007	Enyimba		

International career
1994–2002	Nigeria	17	(2)
Medal record
Winner	FIFA U-17 World Cup	1993
- * Club domestic league appearances and goals

Pascal Karibe Ojigwe (born 11 December 1976) is a Nigerian former professional footballer who played as a defender or defensive midfielder.

== Early life ==
Ojigwe was born in Aba, Nigeria.

== Club career ==
=== Loan to 1. FC Köln ===
Ojigwe went on loan from 1. FC Kaiserslautern to second-tier 1. FC Köln for the 1999–2000 2. Bundesliga season.

=== Bayer Leverkusen ===
Ojigwe refused to return to his parent club and instead moved to Champions League participant Bayer 04 Leverkusen, for a transfer fee reported to be DM 3.5 million (about €1.75 million). On the occasion of the transfer there had been a huge public argument between then Köln and Leverkusen managers, Johannes Linßen and Reiner Calmund.

== Honours ==
1. FC Kaiserslautern

- Bundesliga: 1997–98

Bayer Leverkusen

- UEFA Champions League runner-up: 2001–02
- Bundesliga runner-up: 2001–02
- DFB-Pokal finalist: 2001–02
