= Jürgen Rindler =

Austrian footballer

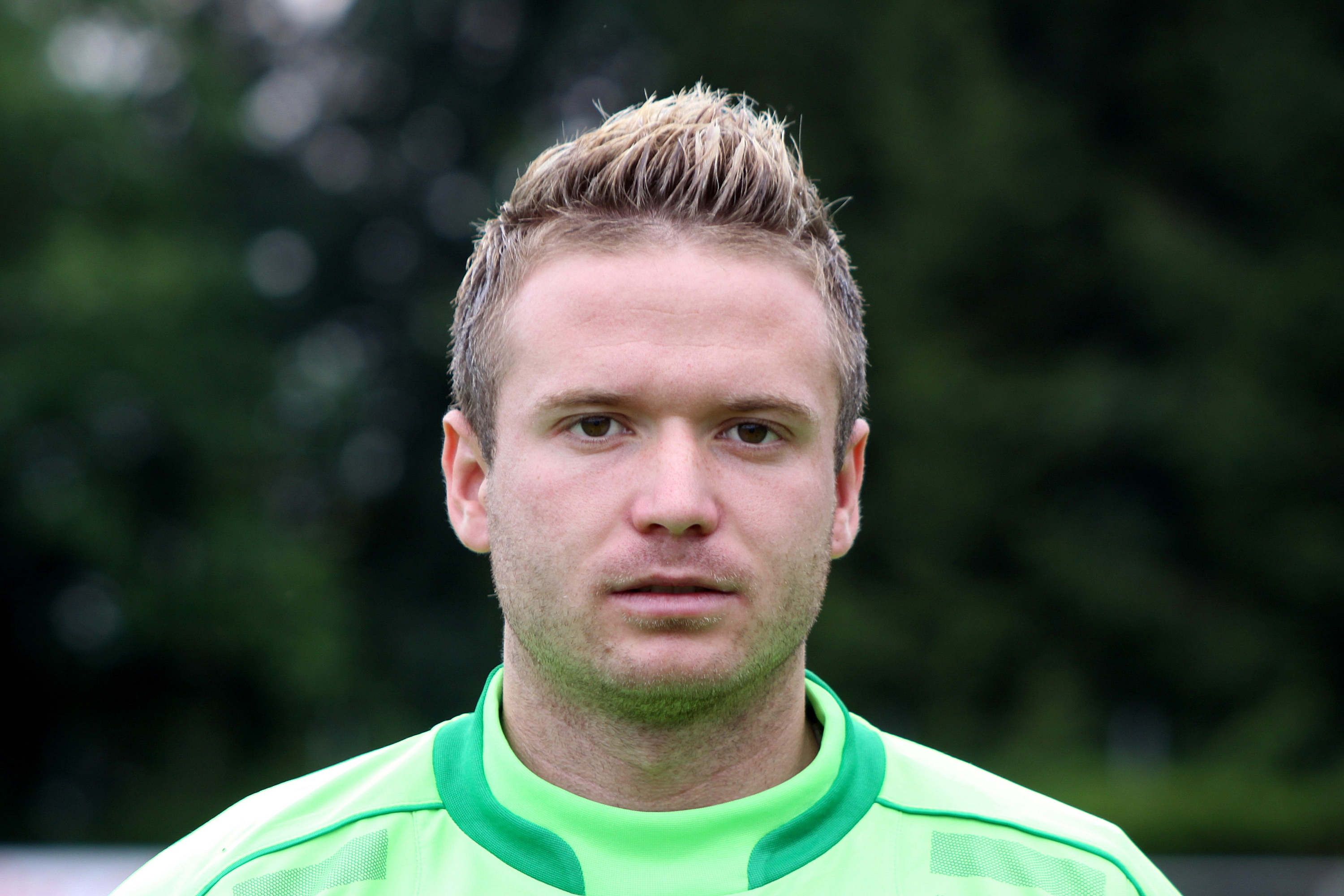
- Jürgen Rindler in 2009

Personal information
- Date of birth: 10 April 1986 (age 40)
- Place of birth: Austria
- Height: 1.84 m (6 ft 1/2 in)
- Position: Goalkeeper

Senior career*
Years	Team	Apps	(Gls)
2005–2006	SV Kapfenberg	1	(0)
2006–	TSV Hartberg	141	(0)
- * Club domestic league appearances and goals as of 23 August 2013

Jürgen Rindler (born 10 April 1986) is an Austrian professional footballer who currently plays as a goalkeeper for Erste Liga club TSV Hartberg.
