= Božo Kovačević (footballer) =

Austrian footballer

Personal information
- Date of birth: 24 December 1979 (age 46)
- Place of birth: Vienna, Austria
- Height: 1.84 m (6 ft 0 in)
- Position: Midfielder

Youth career
- Prater SV
- 1990–1994: Landstraßer Athletik Club
- 1994–1999: Austria Wien

Senior career*
Years	Team	Apps	(Gls)
1999–2001	Austria Wien	3	(0)
2001–2002	→ SC Untersiebenbrunn (loan)	23	(2)
2002–2006	SV Pasching	129	(6)
2007–2009	SV Ried	38	(2)
2009–2010	FC Pasching	29	(3)
2010–2012	SK Vorwärts Steyr	20	(1)
2012–2016	ASKÖ Oedt	78	(17)

International career^{‡}
2002–2006	Austria	7	(0)
- * Club domestic league appearances and goals as of 22:04, 12 August 2015 (UTC) ‡ National team caps and goals as of 31 July 2008

Božo Kovačević (born 24 December 1979) is an Austrian former footballer of Croatian descent.

== Club career ==
Kovačević came to Austria Wien at 15 and started his professional career there at 19, only to be loaned out to Second Division SC Untersiebenbrunn in 2001. He joined SV Pasching a year later and made it with them into the national team. In 2007, he moved to SV Ried.

== International career ==
He made his debut for Austria in an October 2002 European Championship qualification match against Belarus. He earned 7 caps, no goals scored. His last international was a September 2006 friendly match against Venezuela.
