= Benedict Akwuegbu =

Nigerian footballer (born 1974)

Personal information
- Date of birth: 3 November 1974 (age 51)
- Place of birth: Jos, Nigeria
- Height: 1.80 m (5 ft 11 in)
- Position: Striker

Youth career
- 1989–1991: Mighty Jets F.C.

Senior career*
Years	Team	Apps	(Gls)
1991–1992	Lens		
1992–1993	Eendracht Aalst	15	(3)
1994–1996	Harelbeke	49	(14)
1996–1997	Waregem	16	(9)
1997–1998	Tienen	27	(4)
1998–2002	Grazer AK	100	(31)
2002	→ Shenyang Ginde (loan)	18	(2)
2002–2004	Grazer AK	20	(7)
2004	FC Kärnten	14	(6)
2004–2005	St. Gallen	12	(3)
2005–2006	Wacker Innsbruck	11	(0)
2006	Siegen	10	(1)
2006	→ Tianjin Teda (loan)	6	(3)
2006–2007	Panserraikos	10	(12)
2007	Qingdao Jonoon	20	(6)
2008	Beijing Hongdeng	7	(2)
2009–2010	Basingstoke Town	4	(1)

International career
2000–2005	Nigeria	35	(10)

Managerial career
- 2012–2013: Heartland F.C. (assistant general manager)
- 2015–2016: FC Gratkorn (manager)
- 2016–2017: Mighty Jets F.C. (technical director)
- 2025–: Plateau United F.C. (technical consultant)
- * Club domestic league appearances and goals

Benedict Akwuegbu (born 3 November 1974) is a Nigerian former professional footballer who played as a forward. He played for the Nigeria national team and was a 2002 FIFA World Cup participant.

== Club career ==
=== Early career ===
Akwuegbu started his career at the age of 15 in Nigeria before moving to French outfit Lens at the age of 17. Then he spent five years in Belgium with KRC Harelbeke, KSV Waregem, KVK Tienen. Austrian side Grazer AK signed him after the 1998 season.

=== Grazer AK ===
Grazer AK won the Austrian Cup and Austrian Supercup in 2000 and 2002 and the league title in 2004 with his good performance. He won the Best Foreign Player and nicknamed "Austrian Bomber" by the press. He played in 20 European games as he scored 12 including some remarkable goals. He attracted several Bundesliga clubs like Hamburger SV and 1. FC Kaiserslautern. However Grazer AK refused the offer from Kaiserslautern.

He joined English club Plymouth Argyle on trial in December 2005.

=== Qingdao Jonoon ===
In April 2007, Akwuegbu was signed by Qingdao Jonoon. He scored his first goal for Qingdao on 13 May 2007, an 84-minute equaliser in a 3–2 loss away at Shanghai Schenhua. Qingdao Janoon boss, Yin Tiesheng spoke very high about him and his performance in the media, Akwuegbu became one of the most consistent players in the Qingdao squad. He was a vital part in Qingdao attack throughout the campaign and notched six goals in 20 games. Akwuegbu had an excellent season and was favourite of Qingdao Janoon fans.

=== Basingstoke Town ===
Akwuegbu then joined Basingstoke Town in the Conference South. He scored his first goal for the Dragons against Dorchester Town on 5 April 2010. He was released at the end of the season.

== International career ==
Akwuegbu was selected to U-16 World Cup Final squad in 1989 hosted by Scotland. However, he never had the chance to play as sitting on the bench in all four matches without substitution. Nigeria was beaten by eventual winner Saudi Arabia at the quarter-final stage. He also played for the U-20 national side.

In 2000, his success in Austria made him joining the Africa Cup of Nations tournament which he played his first international game against Tunisia. With his progress in the team he was involved in the 2002 World Cup Qualifier and scoring two goals in the process, His performance made him selected to the 2002 World Cup Final squad. He played the only World Cup game against England.

== Post-playing career ==
After hanging up his boots, Ben has held several managerial positions. He currently owns Ben Akwuegbu F C which he acquired in 2022. The team currently plays in Nigeria Nationwide League, the third tier of Nigeria football.

== Honours ==
Grazer AK

- Austrian Football Bundesliga: 2003–04; runner-up 2002–03
- Austrian Cup: 2000, 2002
- Austrian Supercup: 2000, 2002

Nigeria

- Africa Cup of Nations runner-up: 2000
