= Anton Ehmann =

Austrian footballer

Personal information
- Date of birth: 17 December 1972 (age 53)
- Place of birth: Eibiswald, Austria
- Height: 1.88 m (6 ft 2 in)
- Position: Defender

Youth career
- SVL Flavia Solva

Senior career*
Years	Team	Apps	(Gls)
1993–1995	SVL Flavia Solva	14	(2)
1996	LASK Linz	13	(0)
1995–1997	SV Ried	25	(0)
1997–2006	Grazer AK	199	(24)
2006–2007	LASK Linz	31	(4)
2007	SK Schwadorf	4	(0)
2008–2010	FC Gratkorn	37	(2)

International career
2002–2005	Austria	13	(0)

Managerial career
- 2010–11: SV Gleinstätten
- 2011–12: SV Schwanberg
- * Club domestic league appearances and goals as of 12 August 2015

Anton Ehmann (born 17 December 1972) is a retired Austrian football player.

== National team statistics ==
Austria national team
Year	Apps	Goals
2002	1	0
2003	6	0
2004	1	0
2005	5	0
Total	12	0

== Honours ==
- Austrian Football Bundesliga: 2003–2004
- Austrian Cup: 1999–2000, 2001–2002, 2003–2004
