= Emanuel Pogatetz =

Austrian footballer (born 1983)

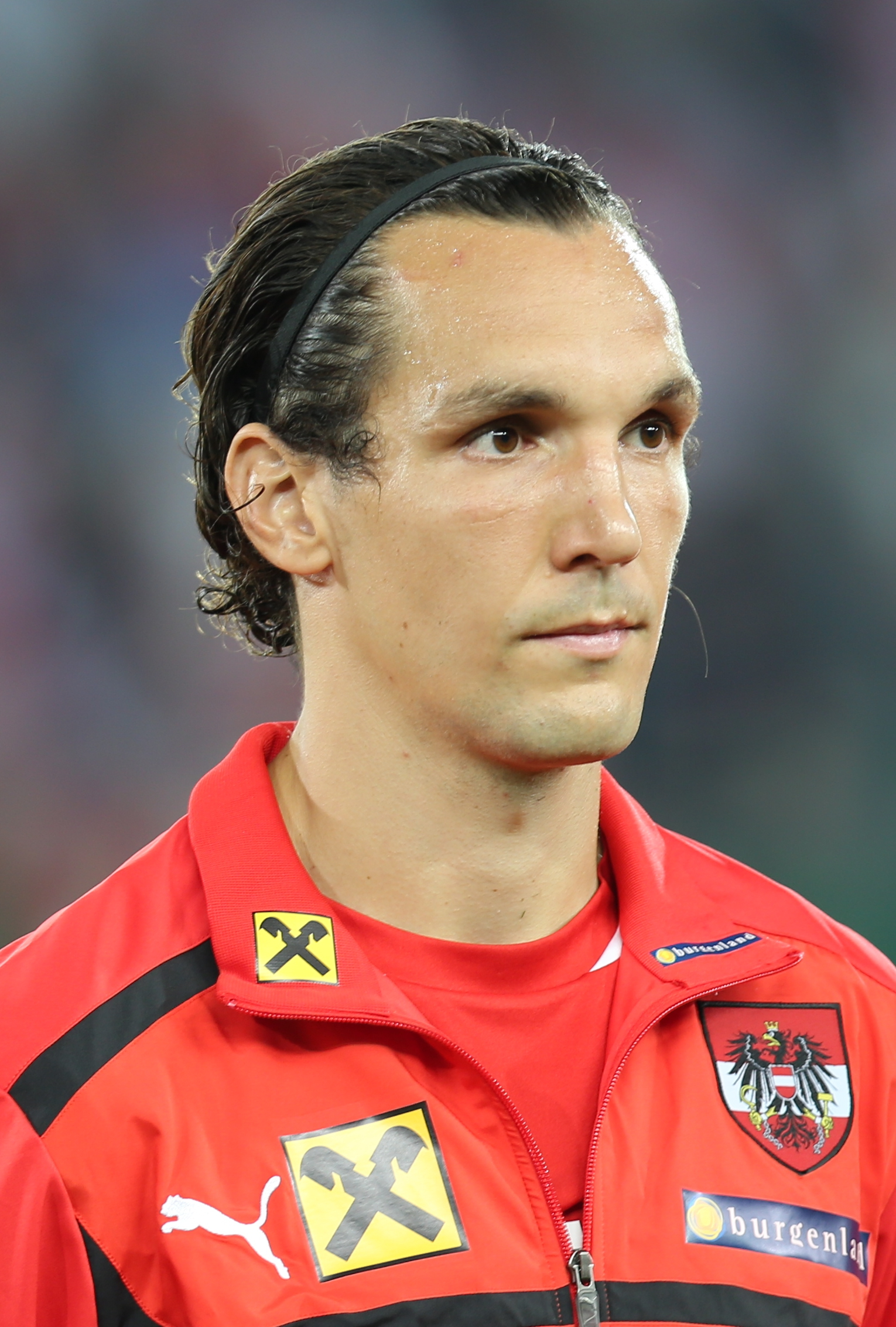
- Pogatetz with Austria in 2012

Personal information
- Full name: Emanuel Pogatetz
- Date of birth: 16 January 1983 (age 43)
- Place of birth: Graz, Austria
- Height: 1.90 m (6 ft 3 in)
- Position: Centre-back

Team information
- Current team: Nottingham Forest (assistant head coach)

Senior career*
Years	Team	Apps	(Gls)
2000–2001	Kärnten	33	(0)
2001–2002	Bayer Leverkusen II	26	(0)
2002–2005	Bayer Leverkusen	0	(0)
2002–2003	→ Aarau (loan)	21	(3)
2003–2004	→ Grazer AK (loan)	53	(2)
2005	→ Spartak Moscow (loan)	11	(0)
2005–2010	Middlesbrough	123	(4)
2010–2012	Hannover 96	57	(1)
2012–2013	VfL Wolfsburg	8	(0)
2013	→ West Ham United (loan)	6	(0)
2013–2014	1. FC Nürnberg	23	(1)
2014–2015	Columbus Crew	21	(0)
2016–2017	Union Berlin	17	(0)
2017–2019	LASK	47	(0)
Total		446	(11)

International career
	Austria U16	22	(0)
	Austria U18	5	(0)
	Austria U19	3	(0)
2001–2002	Austria U21	11	(0)
2002–2014	Austria	61	(2)
- * Club domestic league appearances and goals

Emanuel Pogatetz (born 16 January 1983) is an Austrian professional football coach and a former player. He is currently assistant head coach at Premier League club Nottingham Forest.

As a player, he appeared for Kärnten, Bayer Leverkusen II, Aarau, Spartak Moscow, Middlesbrough, Hannover 96, Vfl Wolfsburg, West Ham United, 1. FC Nürnberg, Columbus Crew, Union Berlin and LASK. At international level, he represented Austria at under-16, under-18, under-19, under-21 and full international level. He was nicknamed "Mad Dog" for his aggressive style of play on the field.

== Club career ==
Born in Graz, Pogatetz's career started at Sturm Graz, before going to Kärnten, and later to Bayer Leverkusen. After a loan spells at Aarau, Grazer AK and Spartak Moscow, he joined Middlesbrough.

He had also been tracked by Fulham, but during his final match on loan at Spartak Moscow, he tackled Yaroslav Kharitonskiy, leaving the Russian with a double leg fracture. Although initially banned for 24 weeks by the Russian Football Union, the suspension was later reduced to eight weeks after Pogatetz attended a personal hearing in Moscow. As the ban commenced in June and was specified as a length of time rather than a number of matches, he ended up missing only three games for his new club Middlesbrough.

=== Middlesbrough ===
Signed by manager Steve McClaren for £1.8 million, his Middlesbrough debut came on 25 August 2005 against Charlton Athletic. With Pogatetz coming on in the second half for Franck Queudrue, Middlesbrough lost 3–0. On 30 March 2006, during the first leg of Middlesbrough's 2–0 UEFA Cup quarter-final defeat against Basel, Pogatetz broke his nose, jaw and cheekbone in an accidental clash of heads with Mladen Petrić and was later warned against returning to full training for three months, for fear of losing his eyesight. He underwent successful surgery to have the fractures reset and Dr. Douglas Bryan declared himself "delighted" with Pogatetz's progress. "It is anticipated he will make a full recovery and be back with his team-mates for pre-season training," said Middlesbrough head physio Grant Downie. "The only disappointing thing for Manny [Pogatetz] is he won't be able to play football, and he was desperate to get back involved. But another blow to his face would risk severe trauma and a potentially eyesight-threatening injury."

Pogatetz suffered from a hernia, for which he received corrective surgery in Munich on 24 April 2006. On 4 July, he returned to training following successful surgery on his hernia and cheek.

In the 2006–07 season, Pogatetz was forced into the centre of defence due to an injury to Chris Riggott. He formed impressive partnerships at the back with both Robert Huth and Jonathan Woodgate, but was able to keep his place, even upon the returns of Woodgate and Riggott. Middlesbrough coach McClaren said: "He never, ever, gives less than 300% in performance." After the 2007–08 season, Pogatetz was given the captain's armband on a full-time basis, following his taking up of the role towards the end of the season. Already known for his disciplinary problems having been booked 20 times in his first two seasons with Middlesbrough, in September 2008 he was involved in a challenge on Manchester United's Rodrigo Possebon in a League Cup game which resulted in Possebon being stretchered from the pitch and having to spend the night in hospital. United manager Alex Ferguson said of the incident "It was an absolutely terrible tackle. Pogatetz should have just walked off the field." Pogatetz was sent-off and served a three match ban.

Pogatetz returned in the 2009–10 season after a long injury layoff, on 31 October in a 1–0 loss to Plymouth Argyle, only to suffer a recurrence of his cheekbone fracture with the scores tied at 0–0. He made his return to the first team against Nottingham Forest on 21 November in a 1–1 draw. He had to wear a protective mask because of his cheekbone fracture which he picked up in the Plymouth game. He received a bang to the head in the Forest game and had to receive stitches at half time, he still completed the full 90 minutes.

=== Hannover 96 ===
On 2 June 2010, he signed for Hannover 96 on a three-year contract making his debut on 21 August in a 2–1 home win against Eintracht Frankfurt.

=== Wolfsburg ===
On 20 June 2012, Pogatetz signed for VfL Wolfsburg. He made his debut on 18 August 2012 in a 5–0 away win at Schönberg 95, assisting the fourth goal by Bas Dost.

==== West Ham United (loan) ====
On 28 January 2013, Pogatetz signed, on loan until the end of the season, with West Ham United. His West Ham debut came on 2 February in a 1–0 home win against Swansea City when he came on as a 90th-minute substitute for Kevin Nolan. He played five more times, before returning to Wolfsburg.

=== 1. FC Nürnberg ===
On 2 July 2013, Pogatetz signed with 1. FC Nürnberg in a swap deal that saw Timm Klose go to Wolfsburg. He made 23 league appearances for the side, scoring once.

=== Columbus Crew ===
On 9 September 2014, Pogatetz signed a three-and-a-half-year deal with the Columbus Crew of Major League Soccer. After a string of "subpar performances" in the beginning of the 2015 season, Pogatetz was benched for Tyson Wahl, which lead to Pogatetz venting his frustrations on his Facebook account, claiming that he was fit enough to play and that head coach Gregg Berhalter and the club did not “value and respect my experience.” He was released at the end of the 2015 season.

=== Union Berlin ===
On 5 January 2016, Pogatetz signed with Union Berlin until the end of the season. Having made only six appearances during the 2016–17 season, his contract was not extended.

=== LASK ===
In May 2017, Pogatetz announced his decision to return to his native Austria and to join LASK.

=== Juniors OÖ ===
On 3 December 2019 it was confirmed that Pogatetz would play for FC Juniors OÖ from 2020, where he also would work as an individual coach.

== International career ==
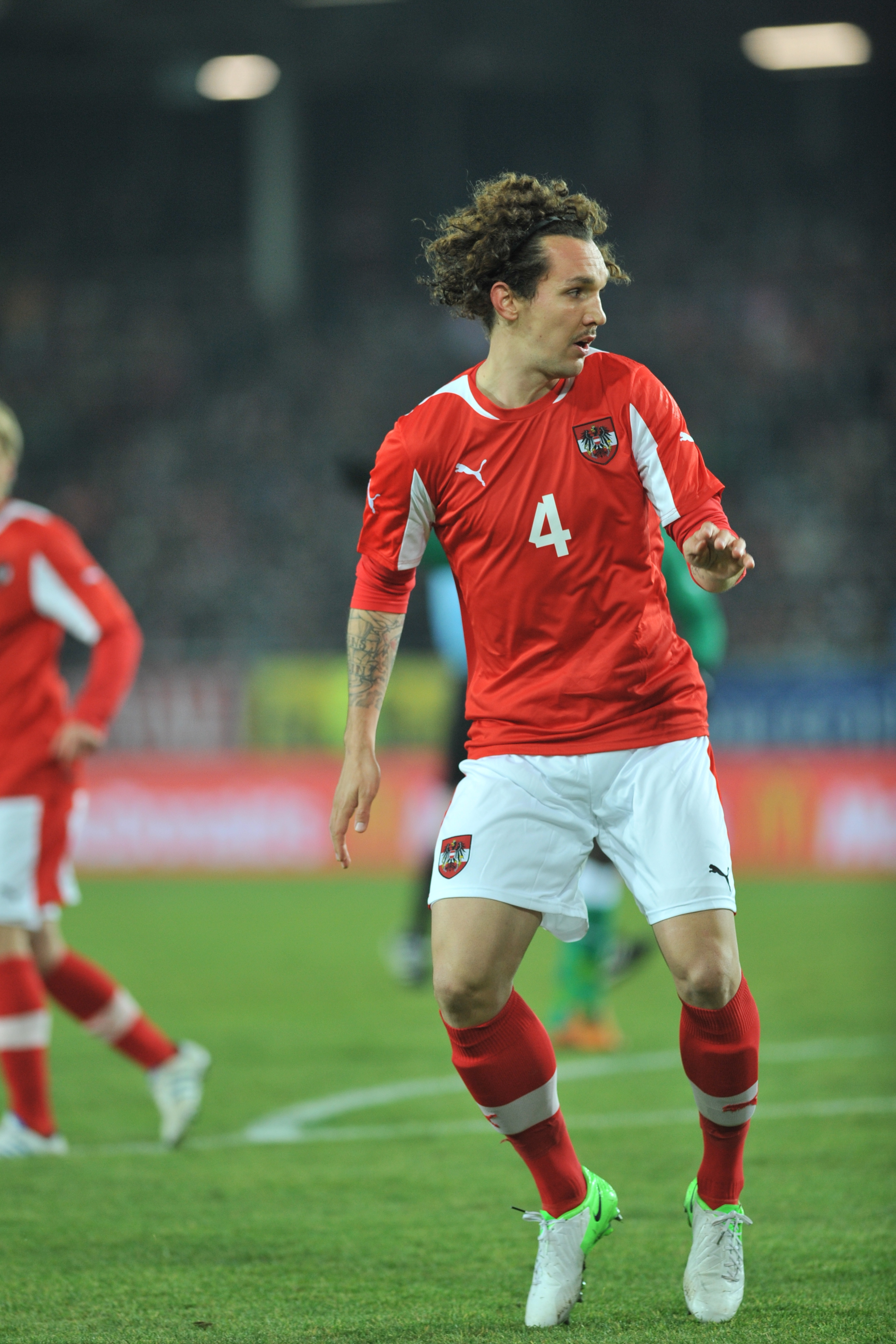
Pogatetz playing for Austria in 2012

Pogatetz made his international debut for Austria on 18 May 2002 in a 6–2 defeat by Germany. He came on in the 83rd minute as a substitute for Ernst Dospel. His first international goal came on 6 September 2003 in a Euro 2004 qualifying game in the Feyenoord Stadium, Rotterdam. With score at 1–0 to Netherlands, Pogatetz equalised only for the game to finish 3–1 to the Netherlands. On 12 October 2005, he was dismissed in an international game against Northern Ireland. In the 73rd minute in a 2–0 win in the Ernst Happel Stadion in Vienna. Pogatetz retaliated to a "reckless challenge" by Northern Ireland's Damien Johnson. Both were dismissed. In September 2006, Pogatetz was banned from playing for his country after he criticised the coach Josef Hickersberger and captain Andreas Ivanschitz after Austria drew with Costa Rica and lost to Venezuela in an international tournament played earlier in the month. In 2008, he was a member of the Austria team at Euro 2008 which Austria co-hosted with Switzerland. He played all three games, against Croatia, Germany and Poland, as Austria failed to make the knock-out stages of the competition.

In March 2009, Pogatetz was named captain of Austria by coach Dietmar Constantini. However, a series of injuries kept Pogatetz out of Austria's team for much of 2009 and 2010, with Christian Fuchs replacing him as captain. His last cap came in 2014.

== Coaching career ==
=== St. Pölten ===
On 10 June 2021, it was announced that Pogatetz would be an assistant coach at St. Pölten, having spent the previous year as the assistant coach of LASK. He left this role in 2023.

=== Crystal Palace ===
Pogatetz joined Premier League club Crystal Palace in February 2024 as part of the coaching team for manager Oliver Glasner.

== International goals ==
#	Date	Venue	Opponent	Score	Result	Competition
1	6 September 2003	Feyenoord Stadium, Rotterdam, Netherlands	Netherlands	1–1	3–1 Loss	Euro 2004 qualifying
2	20 August 2008	Stade du Ray, Nice, France	Italy	1–0	2–2 Draw	Friendly

== Honours ==
Kärnten

- Austrian Cup: 2000–01

Grazer AK

- Austrian Football Bundesliga: 2003–04
- Austrian Cup: 2003–04
