= Andreas Schranz =

Austrian footballer

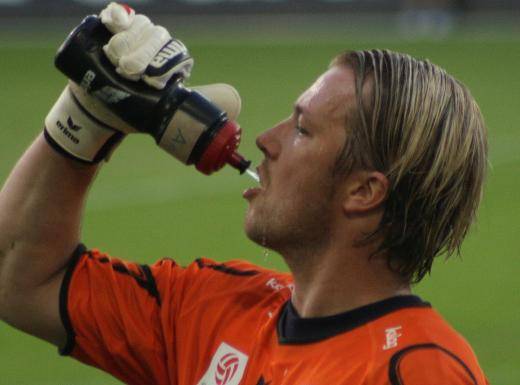

Personal information
- Date of birth: 2 May 1979 (age 47)
- Place of birth: Eisenerz, Austria
- Height: 1.82 m (6 ft 0 in)
- Position: Goalkeeper

Youth career
- 1985–1993: WSV Eisenerz
- 1993–1997: FC Trofaiach

Senior career*
Years	Team	Apps	(Gls)
1997–2007	Grazer AK	165	(0)
2007–2010	SK Austria Kärnten	95	(0)
2011–2012	SV Grödig	38	(0)

International career^{‡}
2004–2006	Austria	6	(0)
- * Club domestic league appearances and goals as of last matchday of season 2011/12 ‡ National team caps and goals as of 23 August 2008

Andreas Schranz (born 2 May 1979) is an Austrian football goalkeeper who last played for SV Grödig.

== Club career ==
Schranz played 10 years for Grazer AK and won the league title with them once, in 2004, and the domestic cup three times. In the 2004/05 Champions League preliminaries he was the goalkeeper when Grazer AK defeated Liverpool F.C. 1–0 at Anfield Road. However, Liverpool F.C. won the away leg 2-0 and later won the UEFA Champions League by beating AC Milan in the final. He left GAK in 2007 after they were demoted to the Regionalliga Mitte because of financial difficulties. He joined SK Austria Kärnten in 2007, but left them too in 2010, after the club dissolved. He signed with lower division team SV Grödig in 2011.

== International career ==
He made his debut for Austria in an April 2004 friendly match against Luxembourg. He earned 6 caps, no goals scored. His final international match was a September 2006 friendly against Venezuela, coming on as a late substitute for striker Roland Linz after first goalkeeper Jürgen Macho was sent off.

== Honours ==
- Austrian Football Bundesliga (1):
  - 2003/04
- Austrian Cup (3):
  - 1999/00, 2001/02, 2003/04
