= Mario Majstorović =

Austrian footballer

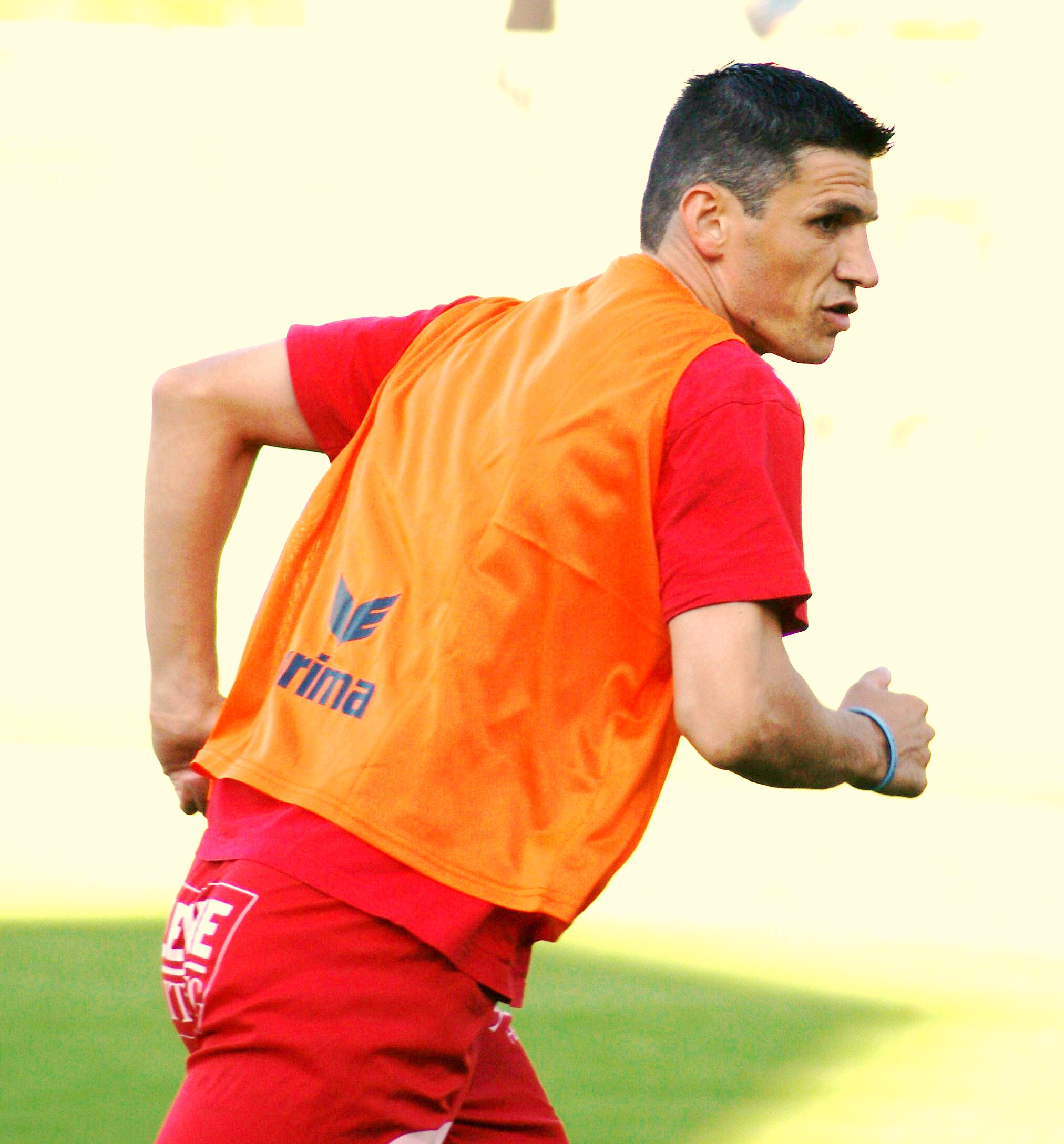
- Majstorović in 2009

Personal information
- Date of birth: 1 March 1977 (age 49)
- Place of birth: Korneuburg, Austria
- Height: 1.81 m (5 ft 11 in)
- Position: Left back

Team information
- Current team: ÖTSU Großmugl
- Number: 8

Youth career
- 1988–1992: ASC Korneuburg
- 1992–1996: Austria Wien

Senior career*
Years	Team	Apps	(Gls)
1996–1997	Favoritner AC Wien		
1997	SV Stockerau		
1997–1998	Wiener SC		
1998	SV Gerasdorf		
1998–2003	Floridsdorfer AC		
2003–2007	Grazer AK	66	(1)
2007–2009	Austria Wien	36	(1)
2009–2010	Kapfenberg	20	(0)
2010–2011	Columbia Floridsdorf	17	(2)
2011–2012	Wiener SC	25	(1)
2012	FC Rohrendorf	2	(0)
2013	FK Bockfließ	8	(0)
2013–2016	SV Draßmarkt	64	(11)
2017–2018	SC Korneuburg	30	(2)
2018–	ÖTSU Großmugl	95	(18)
- * Club domestic league appearances and goals as of 15:49, 31 March 2024 (UTC)

Mario Majstorović (born 1 March 1977 in Korneuburg) is an Austrian footballer who plays for ÖTSU Großmugl.

== Club career ==
Late-developing Majstorović played in the Austrian lower leagues for years, before making his Austrian Football Bundesliga debut with Grazer AK at 26 years of age. In his first season with them he immediately won the Double and four years later he clinched a move to Austrian giants Austria Wien for whose youth team he had played over 10 years before.

== Honours ==
- Austrian Football Bundesliga (1):
  - 2004
- Austrian Cup (2):
  - 2004, 2009
