= Dominic Hassler =

Austrian footballer

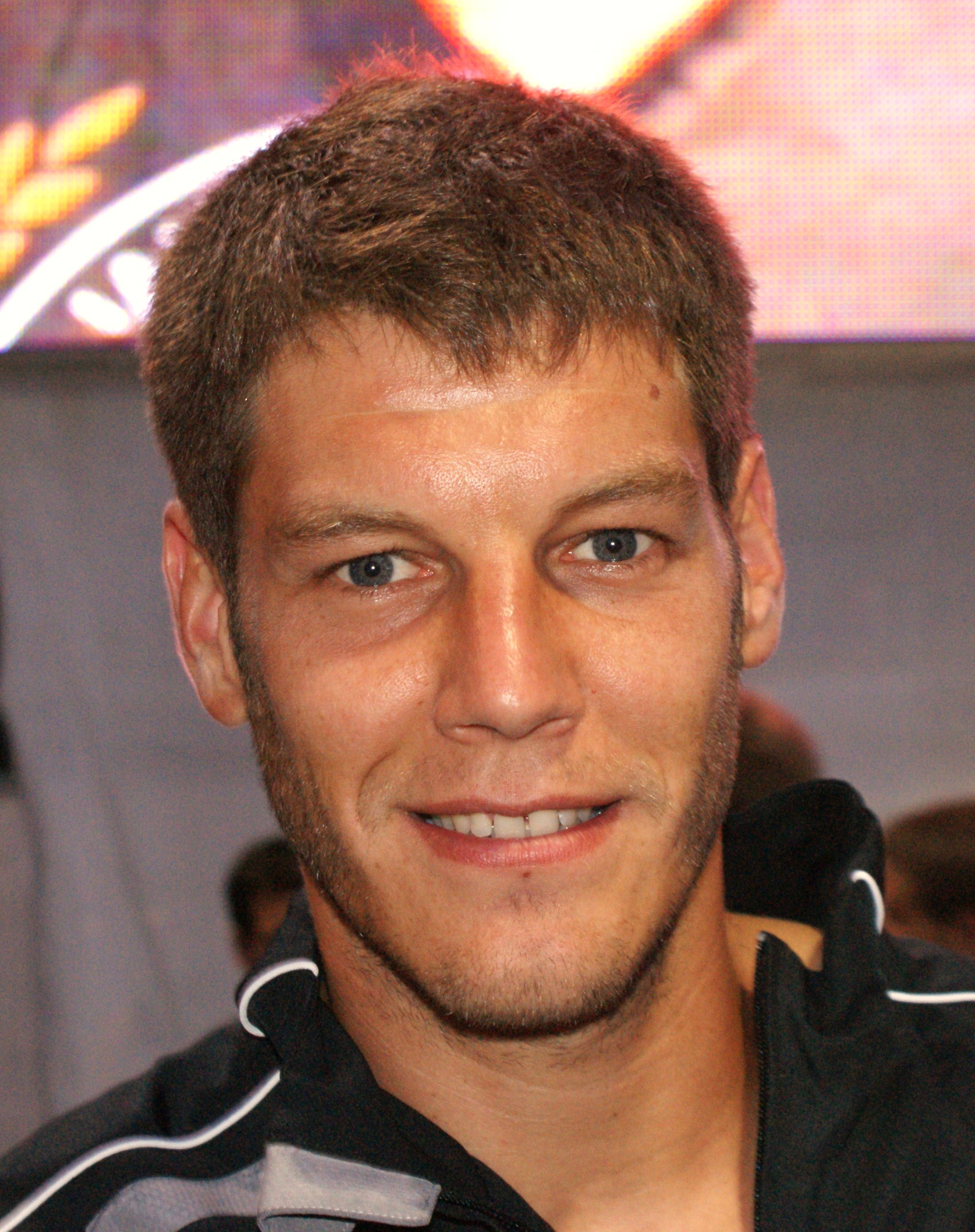

Personal information
- Date of birth: 30 March 1981 (age 45)
- Place of birth: Lienz, Austria
- Height: 1.85 m (6 ft 1 in)
- Position: Striker

Youth career
- SV Irschen

Senior career*
Years	Team	Apps	(Gls)
2001–2003	SV Austria Salzburg	35	(10)
2004–2005	Grazer AK	12	(1)
2005–2006	LASK Linz	13	(3)
2006–2007	Grazer AK	34	(6)
2007–2009	FC Gratkorn	46	(16)
2009–2011	SK Sturm Graz	23	(2)
2011–2012	FC Blau-Weiß Linz	21	(7)
2012–2013	FC Gratkorn	26	(4)
2013–2016	FC Frohnleiten	76	(19)
2016–2018	SV Peggau	38	(24)

International career
	Austria national football team (U21)	5	(0)
- * Club domestic league appearances and goals as of 5 November 2022

Dominic Hassler (born 30 March 1981) is an Austrian former football striker.
