= Franz Almer =

Austrian footballer

Personal information
- Date of birth: September 23, 1970 (age 56)
- Place of birth: Mürzhofen, Austria
- Height: 1.93 m (6 ft 4 in)
- Position: Goalkeeper

Senior career*
Years	Team	Apps	(Gls)
1990–1993	DSV Leoben	14	(0)
1993–2006	Grazer AK	226	(0)

Managerial career
- 2006–2008: Grazer AK (Goalkeeper coach)
- 2008–2010: Red Bull Salzburg Juniors (Goalkeeper coach)
- 2010–2011: Bahrain (Goalkeeper coach)
- 2011–2015: SC Mürzhofen/Allerheiligen
- 2015-2018: GAK 1902 Amateure
- * Club domestic league appearances and goals

Franz Almer (born September 23, 1970) is a retired Austrian goalkeeper who had managed GAK 1902 Amateure.

During his career, Almer made over 200 appearances for Grazer AK.
