= David Sencar =

Austrian footballer

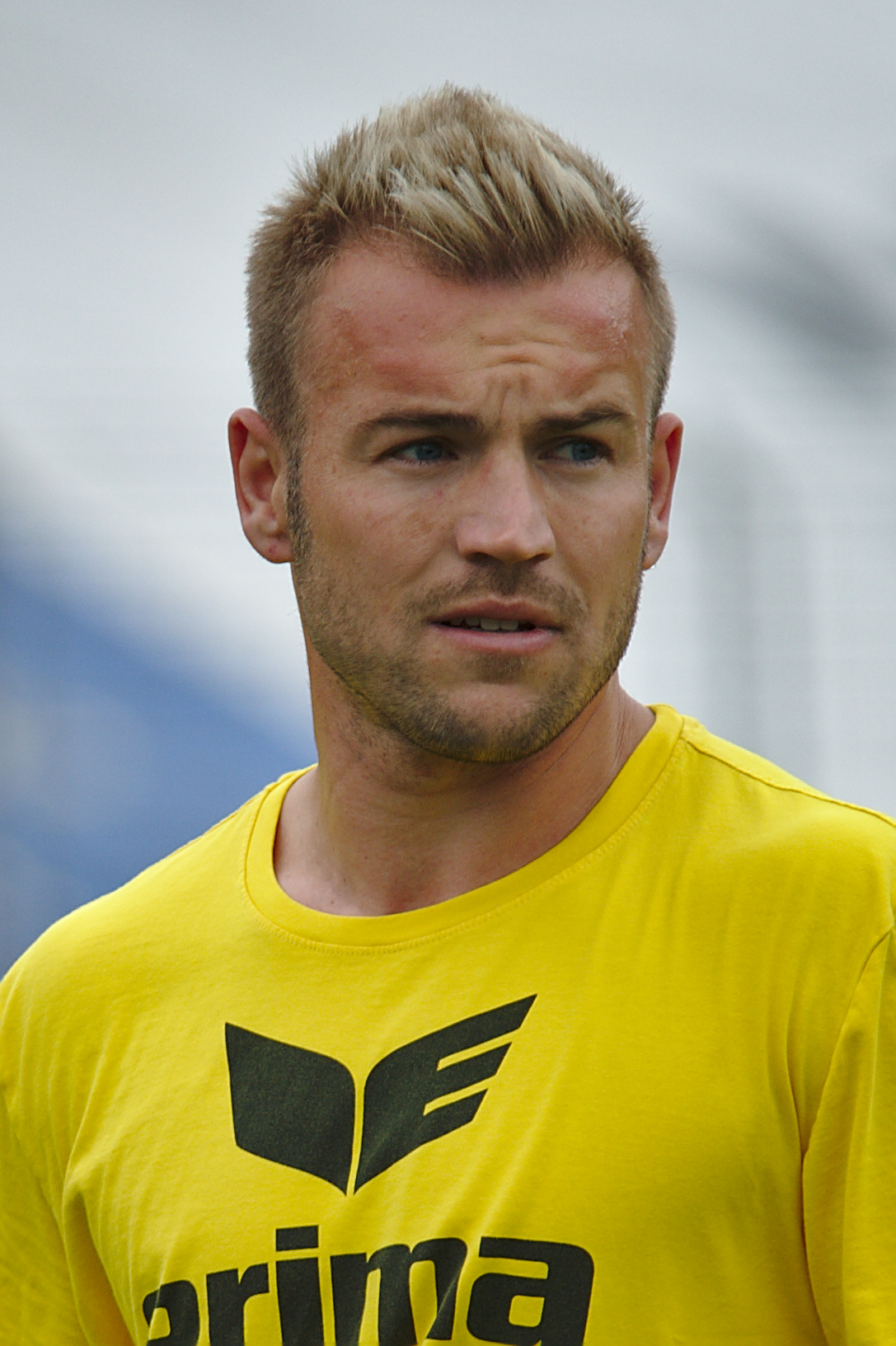
- Sencar in 2017

Personal information
- Date of birth: 29 January 1984 (age 42)
- Place of birth: Leoben, Austria
- Height: 1.76 m (5 ft 9 in)
- Position: Midfielder

Team information
- Current team: SV Kapfenberg (assistant coach)

Senior career*
Years	Team	Apps	(Gls)
2003–2005	Grazer AK	2	(0)
2004–2005	→ Kapfenberg (loan)	27	(4)
2005–2014	Kapfenberg	260	(48)
2014–2015	TSV Hartberg	33	(1)
2015–2016	First Vienna FC	29	(5)
2016–2021	SV Kapfenberg	111	(12)
- SV Hausmannstätten

Managerial career
- 2020–: SV Kapfenberg (assistant)
- * Club domestic league appearances and goals

David Sencar (born 29 January 1984) is an Austrian professional association football coach and a former player. He played as a midfielder. He is acting as an soccerplayer with SV Hausmannstätten.
