= Roland Kollmann =

Austrian footballer

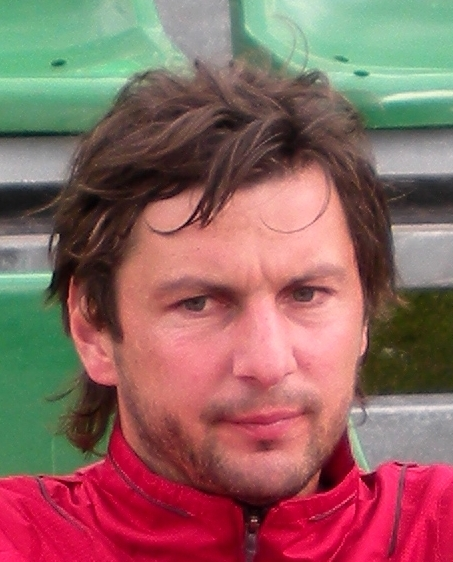
- Kollmann with Grazer AK

Personal information
- Date of birth: 8 October 1976 (age 50)
- Place of birth: Villach, Austria
- Height: 1.83 m (6 ft 0 in)
- Position: Striker

Youth career
- SV Landskron

Senior career*
Years	Team	Apps	(Gls)
1998–1999	FC Wacker Innsbruck	6	(1)
1999–2001	FC Kärnten	64	(41)
2001	FC Twente	8	(0)
2002–2007	Grazer AK	140	(63)
2007–2008	SK Austria Kärnten	26	(5)
2008–2011	Grazer AK	80	(51)
2012–2013	SVG Bleiburg	19	(5)
2013	Schulz Academy	0	(0)
Total		343	(166)

International career
2003–2005	Austria	11	(4)
- * Club domestic league appearances and goals

Roland Kollmann (born 8 October 1976) is an Austrian former professional footballer who played as a striker. He played for Grazer AK until January 2012 when he moved to Carinthia (his "home province") and played for "SVG Bleiburg" (4th division) until November. He also was Bleiburg's team manager. In 2013 he moved to Florida in the US and since 2013 is the Director of coaching at Schulz Academy in Boca Raton, Florida.

== Career statistics ==
Appearances and goals by national team and year
National team	Year	Apps	Goals
Austria	2003	2	0
Austria	2004	8	4
Austria	2005	1	0
Total		11	4

== Honours ==
Grazer AK

- Austrian Bundesliga: 2003–04
- Austrian Cup: 2001–02, 2003–04
- Austrian Supercup: 2002
- Austrian Regionalliga Central: 2011–12

FC Kärnten

- Austrian First League: 2000–01
- Austrian Cup: 2000–01

Individual

- Austrian Bundesliga top scorer: 2003–04 – 27 goals.
