= Bojan Filipović =

Serbian footballer

Personal information
- Full name: Bojan Filipović
- Date of birth: 1 January 1976 (age 50)
- Place of birth: Kruševac, SFR Yugoslavia
- Height: 1.85 m (6 ft 1 in)
- Position: Midfielder

Senior career*
Years	Team	Apps	(Gls)
1994–1999	Napredak	82	(12)
1999–2003	Obilić	118	(40)
2003–2007	Sturm Graz	98	(19)
2007–2008	Schwadorf	21	(3)
2008–2009	Spartak Subotica	16	(0)
- * Club domestic league appearances and goals

Bojan Filipović (Serbian Cyrillic: Бојан Филиповић; born 1 January 1976) is a Serbian retired footballer.

He made a name for himself while playing in his homeland with Obilić from 1999 to 2003, scoring 40 league goals in 118 appearances. He then spent four years with Austrian club Sturm Graz from 2003 to 2007, making 98 league appearances and scoring 19 goals.

== Statistics ==
Club	Season	League	
Club	Season	Apps	Goals
Obilić	1999–00	29	2
Obilić	2000–01	32	18
Obilić	2001–02	31	13
Obilić	2002–03	26	7
Obilić	Total	118	40
