= Axel Lawarée =

Belgian sporting director and former footballer

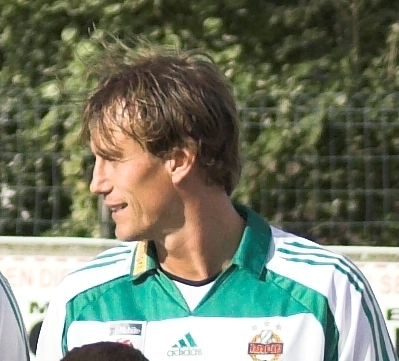
- Lawarée in 2005

Personal information
- Full name: Axel Lawarée
- Date of birth: 9 October 1973 (age 53)
- Place of birth: Huy, Belgium
- Height: 1.78 m (5 ft 10 in)
- Position: Striker

Team information
- Current team: Royal Belgian FA (coach)

Youth career
- 1981–1985: Ampsin Sport
- 1985–1993: RFC Seraing

Senior career*
Years	Team	Apps	(Gls)
1993–1996	RFC Seraing	71	(18)
1996–1997	Standard Liège	35	(12)
1997–1998	Sevilla	12	(1)
1998–2001	Mouscron	47	(15)
2001–2003	SC Bregenz	125	(62)
2004–2006	Rapid Wien	26	(4)
2006–2007	FC Augsburg	33	(15)
2007–2010	Fortuna Düsseldorf	69	(21)
2010–2011	TuS Bösinghoven	11	(4)
2011–2013	RFC Hannutois	27	(6)
2013–2014	FC Richelle United	15	(5)
2014	JS Vivegnis	10	(2)
Total		481	(165)
- * Club domestic league appearances and goals

Axel Lawarée (born 9 October 1973) is a Belgian former professional footballer, who played as a striker, and the current sporting director of Standard Liège.

== Management career ==
In 2010, Lawarée founded a consulting firm which was named Axel Lawarée Consulting SPRL and was located in Oupeye, Belgium. The firm was also working together with the Royal Belgian Football Association.

In November 2014, Lawarée was appointed as a sports advisor and sporting director at Standard Liège, replacing Jean-François De Sart who left his position a few months before. In February 2016, he was assigned a new role as director of the club's youth department. However, on 16 May 2016, Standard announced that the club had decided to end its collaboration with Lawarée.

Two months later, he was appointed sporting director of his former club, RFC Seraing. From January 2017, he got a new role at Seraing as technical director of the club's youth department. Seraing announced on 21 June 2019, that Lawarée would leave the club to start a new chapter with a job at the Royal Belgian Football Association as manager of the national football center of Tubize.

== Honours ==
Rapid Wien

- Austrian Bundesliga: 2004–05

Individual

- Austrian Bundesliga top scorer: 2002–03 (21 goals)
