= Dieter Ramusch =

Austrian footballer

Personal information
- Date of birth: October 31, 1969 (age 56)
- Place of birth: Traundorf bei Globasnitz, Austria
- Height: 1.75 m (5 ft 9 in)
- Position: Defender

Youth career
- St. Michael ob Bleiburg

Senior career*
Years	Team	Apps	(Gls)
1987–1990	FC Kärnten	20	(3)
1990–1994	SKN St. Pölten	124	(17)
1994–1995	LASK Linz	32	(6)
1995–2005	Grazer AK	289	(27)

International career
1991–1992	Austria U-21	10	(0)
1995–1997	Austria	10	(1)
- * Club domestic league appearances and goals

Dieter Ramusch (born October 31, 1969, in Traundorf bei Globasnitz) is a retired Austria international footballer.

== International goal ==
Scores and results list Austria's goal tally first.

No	Date	Venue	Opponent	Score	Result	Competition
1.	16 August 1995	Daugava Stadium, Riga, Latvia	Latvia	2–2	2–3	Euro 1996 qualifier
