= Matthias Dollinger =

Austrian footballer

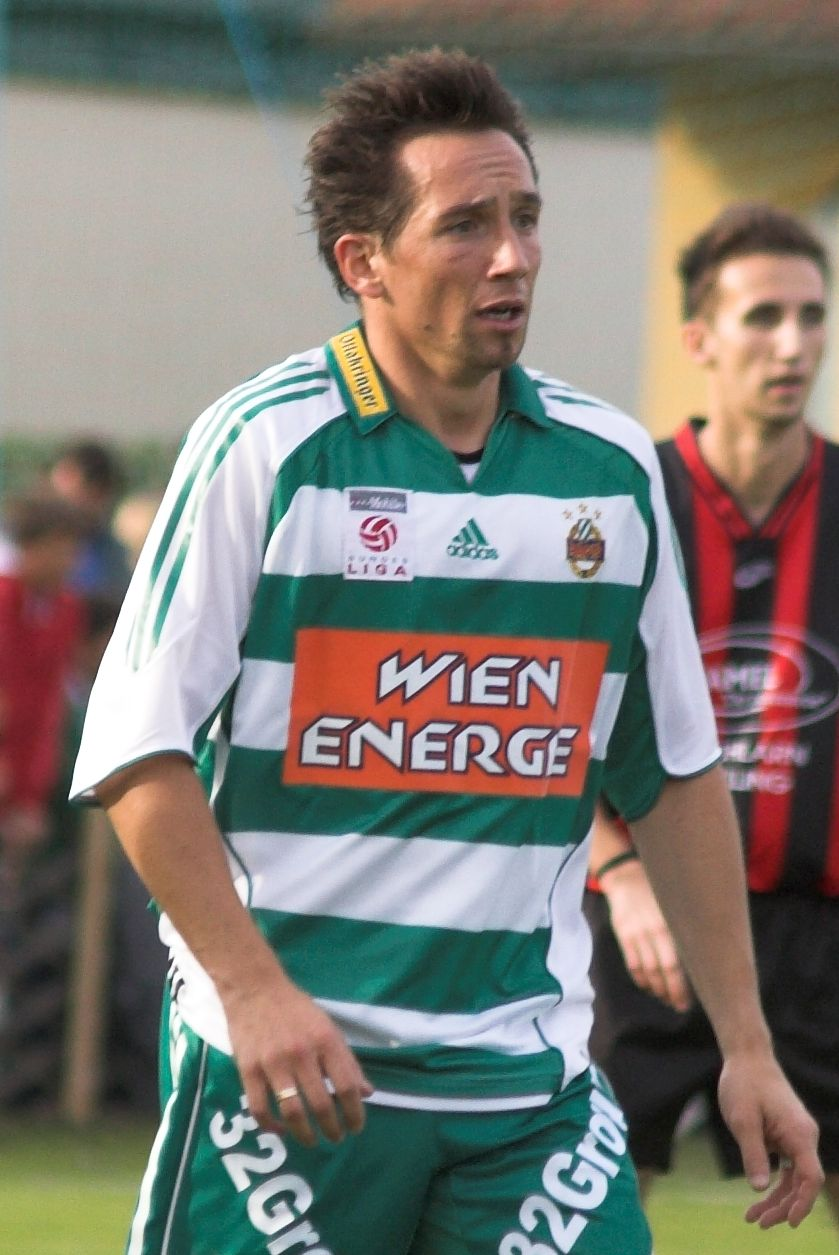

Personal information
- Date of birth: 12 September 1979 (age 47)
- Place of birth: Klagenfurt, Austria
- Height: 1.76 m (5 ft 9 in)
- Position: Midfielder

Senior career*
Years	Team	Apps	(Gls)
- SV Skt. Veit
- FC Kärnten
- BSV Bad Bleiberg
1999–2001	SV Spittal an der Drau	22	(4)
2001–2003	DSV Leoben	58	(18)
2004–2005	Grazer AK	43	(1)
2005–2007	SK Rapid Wien	24	(0)
2007–2008	LASK Linz	30	(3)
2008	→ SC Schwanenstadt (loan)	10	(3)
2008–2010	SK Austria Kärnten	34	(1)
2010–2013	SV Austria Klagenfurt	81	(25)
2014–2017	Annabichler SV	97	(41)
2018–2019	ASK Klagenfurt		

International career
2002–2005	Austria	7	(0)
- * Club domestic league appearances and goals

Matthias Dollinger (born 12 September 1979) is an Austrian former footballer.

== Career ==
After spending several years in Austria's lower leagues, Dollinger made his Bundesliga debut at 25 years of age for Grazer AK in the 2004–05 season. He subsequently earned a move to Rapid Wien but left the Vienna giants after two seasons to join LASK.

== National team statistics ==
Austria national team
Year	Apps	Goals
2002	1	0
2003	1	0
2004	4	0
2005	1	0
Total	7	0

== Personal life ==
His son born in 2005, also called Matthias, is now a footballer as well.
