= Gernot Sick =

Austrian footballer

Personal information
- Date of birth: October 31, 1978 (age 48)
- Place of birth: Judenburg, Austria
- Height: 1.88 m (6 ft 2 in)
- Position: Midfielder

Senior career*
Years	Team	Apps	(Gls)
1996–2007	Grazer AK	148	(5)
2001–2002	→ SC Schwarz-Weiß Bregenz (loan)	8	(0)

International career
1998–1999	Austria U-21	7	(0)
2004	Austria	2	(0)

Managerial career
- 2012–: Grazer AK (youth manager)
- * Club domestic league appearances and goals

Gernot Sick (born October 31, 1978, in Judenburg) is a retired Austrian international footballer. He had to retire at the age of 28 after numerous knee operations.
