= 2003–04 Austrian Football Bundesliga =

86th season of top-tier football league in Austria

Austrian Bundesliga
- Season: 2003–04
- Dates: 16 July 2003 – 20 May 2004
- Champions: Grazer AK; 1st Bundesliga title 1st Austrian title
- Relegated: Kärnten
- Champions League: Grazer AK
- UEFA Cup: Austria Wien; Pasching; Rapid Wien
- Intertoto Cup: Bregenz
- Matches: 180
- Goals: 481 (2.67 per match)
- Top goalscorer: Roland Kollmann (27)

The 2003–04 Austrian Football Bundesliga was the 30th season of the Austrian Football Bundesliga, Austria's premier football league. It began on 16 July 2003 and concluded on 20 May 2004.

== Overview ==
It was contested by 10 teams. Grazer AK won the championship and FC Karnten was relegated.

== League standings ==
Pos	Team	Pld	W	D	L	GF	GA	GD	Pts	Qualification or relegation
1	Grazer AK (C)	36	21	9	6	62	32	+30	72	Qualification to Champions League third qualifying round
2	Austria Wien	36	21	8	7	63	31	+32	71	Qualification to UEFA Cup second qualifying round
3	Pasching	36	17	12	7	59	41	+18	63	Qualification to UEFA Cup second qualifying round
4	Rapid Wien	36	16	9	11	50	47	+3	57	Qualification to UEFA Cup second qualifying round
5	Bregenz	36	11	12	13	47	58	−11	45	Qualification to Intertoto Cup second round
6	Admira Wacker Mödling	36	11	9	16	42	49	−7	42	
7	Austria Salzburg	36	11	5	20	44	48	−4	38	
8	Mattersburg	36	9	10	17	39	61	−22	37	
9	Sturm Graz	36	8	11	17	39	52	−13	35	
10	Kärnten (R)	36	7	11	18	36	62	−26	32	Relegation to Austrian First Football League

Source: weltfussball.de (in German)
Rules for classification: 1) points; 2) goal difference; 3) number of goals scored.
(C) Champions; (R) Relegated

== Results ==
Teams played each other four times in the league. In the first half of the season each team played every other team twice (home and away), and then did the same in the second half of the season.

=== First half of season ===
Home \ Away	ADM	ASZ	AWI	BRE	GRA	KÄR	MAT	PAS	RWI	STU
Admira Wacker Mödling		4–0	0–2	0–1	1–1	1–0	1–1	4–0	4–2	2–1
Austria Salzburg	1–2		0–0	0–1	1–2	5–0	4–0	0–2	1–2	5–0
Austria Wien	2–1	0–0		4–0	0–1	3–0	3–0	1–0	2–0	1–1
Bregenz	2–2	1–0	4–2		4–1	3–2	2–1	1–2	1–2	2–1
Grazer AK	1–0	1–0	1–3	2–0		5–1	1–1	1–1	2–0	1–0
Kärnten	2–0	1–2	2–1	1–1	1–4		1–2	0–0	2–0	0–3
Mattersburg	1–1	0–1	0–1	3–2	0–0	0–0		4–2	1–4	3–1
Pasching	3–0	3–2	2–4	3–1	1–2	3–0	1–1		1–2	2–1
Rapid Wien	1–0	1–0	2–2	2–2	2–1	2–2	3–1	4–2		2–0
Sturm Graz	2–0	4–2	0–0	1–1	2–1	0–0	0–1	0–1	0–2	

Source: weltfussball.de (in German)
Legend: Blue = home team win; Yellow = draw; Red = away team win.

=== Second half of season ===
Home \ Away	ADM	ASZ	AWI	BRE	GRA	KÄR	MAT	PAS	RWI	STU
Admira Wacker Mödling		3–2	0–1	0–0	2–1	1–1	2–0	1–2	1–0	0–0
Austria Salzburg	2–1		0–1	2–0	1–2	3–2	1–0	1–2	2–0	0–0
Austria Wien	5–1	3–0		4–1	1–3	2–0	1–0	0–1	1–1	5–1
Bregenz	2–2	2–2	0–1		1–0	1–1	3–2	1–1	1–1	2–1
Grazer AK	2–1	3–0	0–0	1–0		4–1	1–0	1–1	2–1	1–1
Kärnten	0–0	0–3	2–0	3–2	0–0		5–1	1–1	0–1	2–0
Mattersburg	3–0	2–1	4–1	1–1	1–4	2–0		0–0	1–1	2–2
Pasching	2–1	1–0	1–1	3–0	3–3	1–1	4–0		2–0	3–0
Rapid Wien	1–3	2–0	1–2	0–0	0–4	3–2	2–0	0–0		1–1
Sturm Graz	2–0	0–0	1–3	4–1	0–2	2–0	4–0	2–2	1–2	

Source: weltfussball.de (in German)
Legend: Blue = home team win; Yellow = draw; Red = away team win.

== Top goal scorers ==
Rank	Scorer	Club	Goals
1	(Austria) Roland Kollmann	Grazer AK	27
2	(Norway) Sigurd Rushfeldt	Austria Wien	25
3	(Austria) Roland Linz	Admira Wacker Mödling	15
3	(Austria) Christian Mayrleb	ASKÖ Pasching	15
5	(Poland) Radosław Gilewicz	Austria Wien	13
6	(Austria) Mario Haas	Sturm Graz	10
6	(Germany) Steffen Hofmann	Rapid Wien	10
6	(Austria) Dietmar Kühbauer	SV Mattersburg	10
6	(Czech Republic) René Wagner	Rapid Wien	10

== Attendances ==
#	Club	Average
1	Rapid	12,324
2	Mattersburg	11,069
3	GAK	9,007
4	Salzburg	8,441
5	Sturm	7,836
6	Austria	6,684
7	Kärnten	5,389
8	Bregenz	5,329
9	Pasching	3,760
10	Admira	2,319
