= 2005–06 Austrian Cup =

Tournament details
- Country: Austria

Final positions
- Champions: Austria Vienna
- Runners-up: SV Mattersburg

Tournament statistics
- Top goal scorer(s): Radoslaw Gilewicz, Michael Morz (3)

The 2005–06 Austrian Cup (German: ÖFB-Cup) was the 72nd season of Austria's nationwide football cup competition. It started on July 26, 2005 with the first game of the preliminary round. The final was held at the Ernst-Happel-Stadion, Vienna on 9 May 2006.

The competition was won by Austria Vienna after beating Mattersburg 3–0. Due to Austria Vienna qualifying for European competition through winning the Bundesliga, Mattersburg qualified for the second qualifying round of the 2006–07 UEFA Cup as cup runners-up.

== Preliminary round ==
The Preliminary Round involved 60 lower league clubs from all regional federations. Thirty games were played between July 26 and August 15, 2005, with the winners advancing to the first round.

Team 1	Score	Team 2
26 July 2005
GAK Amateure	2–2 (a.e.t.) (5–4 p)	SV Bad Aussee
29 July 2005
SV Spittal	3–0	SVG Bleiburg
ASK Köflach	2–0	SC Weiz
SV Würmla	4–3	Trenkwalder Admira Reserves
SV Neuberg	2–3 (a.e.t.)	FC Waidhofen/Ybbs
SKN St. Pölten	2–0	SC Neusiedl am See 1919
Kremser SC	2–0	SV Rohrbach
30 July 2005
FC Wels	0–3	ATSV Sattledt
DSG Union Perg	2–0	Union St. Florian
SV Leobendorf	0–1	SV Langenrohr
29 July 2005
SK St. Andrä	2–0	FC St. Veit
SV Tondach	1–0	SC Kalsdorf
1 August 2005
Seekirchen	0–0 (a.e.t.) (4–5 p)	1. FC Vöcklabruck
ASK Kottingbrunn	1–1 (a.e.t.) (2–4 p)	TSV Hartberg
2 August 2005
FC Lustenau 07	2–3	FC Koblach
FC Hard	1–3	WSG Wattens
SPG Axams Götzens	4–3	SVG Reichenau/Aldrans
SV Hall in Tirol	4–0	Innsbrucker SK
FC Zell am See	0–1	PSV/Schwarz Weiß Salzburg
Feldkirchen	0–2	SAK Klagenfurt
3 August 2005
Salzburg Amateure	11–0	FC Puch
5 August 2005
1.SC Sollenau	3–0	SK Slovan HAC
9 August 2005
Sturm Graz Amateure	5–2 (a.e.t.)	ASK Voitsberg
Union Vöcklamarkt	3–3 (a.e.t.) (8–7 p)	FC Blau-Weiß Linz
ASKÖ Donau Linz	1–2	SK St. Magdalena/Pasching Amateure
FC Stadlau	1–2 (a.e.t.)	SC Eisenstadt
SC Ritzing	0–1	Wiener Sport-Club
PSV Team für Wien	6–0	ASK Klingenbach
SC Zwettl	1–2 (a.e.t.)	SV Donau Wien
15 August 2005
Vienna	2–1	SK Schwadorf

== First round ==
Team 1	Score	Team 2
13 September 2005
SV Donau	6–0	FC Kufstein
20 September 2005
Wiener Sportklub	3–2	PSV Team für Wien
26 September 2005
SV Spittal/Drau	3–1	FC Kärnten
FC Waidhofen/Ybbs	5-3	SK St. Magdalena/Pasching Amateure
27 September 2005
SV Würmla	0–1	FC Gratkorn
TSV Hartberg	0–1	SC Austria Lustenau
PSV SW Salzburg	0–10	SC Rheindorf Altach
1. FC Vöcklabruck	0–2	LASK Linz
ATSV Sattledt	0–2	FC Wacker Tirol
FC Koblach	0–8	SV Kapfenberg
Köflach ASKÖ	1–2	SC Schwanenstadt
WSG Wattens	3–3 (a.e.t.) (3–5 p)	DSV Leoben
Vienna	2–3	Salzburg
SV Hall in Tirol	0–5	Admira
SC Eisenstadt	1–2	FK Austria Wien Amateure
DSG Union Perg	2–0	1.SC Sollenau
SK St. Andrä	5–2	Union Vöcklamarkt
28 September 2005
SK Sturm Amateure	2–1	Salzburg Amateure
Kremser SC	3–5	Sturm Graz
SV Gleinstätten	0–2	SV Ried
GAK Amateure	1–2	SV Mattersburg
SPG Axams Götzens	1–2	SV Langenrohr

SAK Klagenfurt and SKN St. Pölten received byes to the second round

== Second round ==
The Bundesliga clubs entered at the second round, except Rapid Wien, Austria Wien, Grazer AK and Pasching who were involved in European competition and given a bye to Round 3. The games were played on October 17–19, 2005.

Team 1	Score	Team 2
17 October 2005
SV Spittal/Drau	1–4	SC Rheindorf Altach
18 October 2005
Wiener Sportklub	1–5	SV Kapfenberg
SAK Klagenfurt	0–1	FC Gratkorn
SV Donau	0–4	SC Schwanenstadt
FC Waidhofen/Ybbs	1–3	SV Mattersburg
DSG Union Perg	0–3	LASK Linz
SK Sturm Amateure	0–3	FC Wacker Tirol
SV Langenrohr	4–5	Sturm Graz
SC Austria Lustenau	2–0	DSV Leoben
FK Austria Wien Amateure	1–0	Red Bull Salzburg
19 October 2005
SK St. Andrä	1–3	SV Ried
SKN St. Pölten	1–1 (a.e.t.) (4–3 p)	Admira Wacker Mödling

== Third round ==
The winners of last year's competition, SV Horn, entered in this round. The games were played between March 7 and 22, 2006.

Team 1	Score	Team 2
7 March 2006
SV Pasching	3–1	Grazer AK
SV Mattersburg	3–0	SC Schwanenstadt
SV Kapfenberg	2–0	LASK Linz
8 March 2006
SC Austria Lustenau	1–1 (a.e.t.) (2–4 p)	Rapid Wien
21 March 2006
SKN St. Polten	1–3	FC Gratkorn
FK Austria Amateure	0–5	SV Ried
SC Rheindorf Altach	2–0	Sturm Graz
22 March 2006
Austria Wien	2–0	Admira Wacker Mödling

== Quarter-finals ==
4 April 2006	SC Rheindorf Altach	2–3 (a.e.t.)	SV Pasching	Altach
19:00	Jagne 35' (pen.); Sara 95'		Kabát 23', 93'; Milojevic 118'	Stadium: Stadion Schnabelholz; Attendance: 2,500; Referee: Louis Hofmann

4 April 2006	SV Kapfenberg	0–1	Austria Wien	Kapfenberg
19:00			Prettenthaler 59' (o.g.)	Stadium: Franz-Fekete-Stadion; Attendance: 2,368; Referee: Manfred Krassnitzer

4 April 2006	FC Gratkorn	1–2	SV Ried	Gratkorn
19:00	Panagiotopoulos 42'		Kuljić 38'; Brunmayr 72'	Stadium: Sportstadion Gratkorn; Attendance: 1,500; Referee: Wolfgang Falb

4 April 2006	SV Mattersburg	1–0	Rapid Wien	Mattersburg
19:15	T.Wagner 90'			Stadium: Pappelstadion; Attendance: 11,300; Referee: Stefan Meßner

== Semi-finals ==
18 April 2006	SV Pasching	2–3	SV Mattersburg	Pasching
18:30	Voříšek 41'; Gilewicz 64'		Patocka 27'; Mörz 31', 68'	Stadium: Waldstadion; Attendance: 1,255; Referee: Thomas Steiner

19 April 2006	Austria Wien	4–0	SV Ried	Vienna
18:30	Šebo 29'; Troyansky 57'; Dheedene 69'; Papac 90+1'			Stadium: Franz Horr Stadium; Attendance: 1,590; Referee: Robert Schörgenhofer

== Final ==
9 May 2006
20:30

Austria Wien	3–0	SV Mattersburg
Šebo 27'; Rushfeldt 45'; Troyansky 82'

Ernst-Happel-Stadion, Vienna
Attendance: 20,100
Referee: Louis Hofmann

== See also ==
- 2005–06 Austrian Football Bundesliga
- 2005–06 Austrian First League
