= List of Iraqi expatriate footballers =

Many Iraqis were forced to leave their homeland during different periods of political instability, wars and economic hardship, particularly following the Gulf War, the Iraq War and the 2003 invasion of Iraq. As a result, large Iraqi communities emerged across Europe, North America and Australia, producing several generations of footballers who developed in foreign academies and professional systems abroad.

In the 2010s and 2020s, the Iraq Football Association increasingly relied on diaspora players to strengthen the national team and youth selections. Iraqi footballers abroad have notably emerged in countries such as Sweden, Denmark, England, Germany, Australia and the Netherlands, with many players being of Assyrian, Kurdish or Arab Iraqi descent.

Some players represented the national teams of their countries of birth at youth level before later switching allegiance to Iraq, while others continue to play abroad without international caps. Iraqi diaspora footballers have become an increasingly visible part of Iraqi football. This has widened the player pool available to Iraqi national teams and has allowed the country to draw on players with experience in different tactical and developmental environments.

- Players marked in **bold** have represented the Iraqi national team at senior or youth international level.
- The tables include both professional and youth players of Iraqi origin currently active abroad or in foreign football systems.

== Iraq ==
The following players currently play in Iraq but began their careers abroad.

Player	Date of birth	Club	Position	Height	Preferred foot	Refs
**Abbas Mohamad**	15 June 1998 (age 28)	Amanat Baghdad SC (Iraq Stars League) (#6)	Centre-back	186 cm (6 ft 1 in)	Right	
Abdelelah Faisal	27 October 2005 (age 21)	Al-Karma SC (Iraq Stars League) (#8)	Left winger	178 cm (5 ft 10 in)	Right	
Hussein Shehait	21 January 2006 (age 20)	Al-Karma SC (Iraq Stars League)	Centre-back			
**Louaï El Ani**	12 July 1997 (age 29)	Al-Karma SC (Iraq Stars League) (#10)	Attacking midfielder	175 cm (5 ft 9 in)	Right	
Mustafa Owaid	19 May 2001 (age 25)	Al-Gharraf SC (Iraq Stars League) (#20)	Right-back		Right	
Aysar Qasim Mohammed	1 September 2002 (age 24)	Al-Qasim SC (Iraq Stars League) (#80)	Left winger	168 cm (5 ft 6 in)	Right	
**Alexander Aoraha**	27 January 2003 (age 23)	Al-Zawraa SC (Iraq Stars League) (#9)	Defensive midfielder	178 cm (5 ft 10 in)	Left	
**Ahmad Allée**	29 April 1996 (age 30)	Duhok SC (Iraq Stars League) (#18)	Central midfielder	172 cm (5 ft 7 1/2 in)	Right	
**André Alsanati**	6 January 2000 (age 26)	Duhok SC (Iraq Stars League) (#19)	Right winger	164 cm (5 ft 4 1/2 in)	Left	
**Blnd Hassan**	12 August 2003 (age 23)	Duhok SC (Iraq Stars League) (#9)	Left winger	183 cm (6 ft 0 in)	Right	
Haron Ahmed Zubair	9 December 1995 (age 30)	Duhok SC (Iraq Stars League) (#10)	Attacking midfielder			
**Josef Al-Imam**	27 July 2004 (age 22)	Duhok SC (Iraq Stars League) (#3)	Centre-back	184 cm (6 ft 1/2 in)	Left	
**Pashang Abdulla**	29 May 1994 (age 32)	Duhok SC (Iraq Stars League) (#11)	Centre-forward	184 cm (6 ft 1/2 in)		
Zana Allée	1 March 1994 (age 32)	Duhok SC (Iraq Stars League) (#25)	Left winger	164 cm (5 ft 4 1/2 in)	Right	
**Kumel Al-Rekabe**	19 August 2004 (age 22)	Erbil SC (Iraq Stars League) (#34)	Goalkeeper			
Lass Hamawand	26 July 2004 (age 22)	Erbil SC (on loan) (Iraq Stars League) (#8)	Central midfielder			
Hamid Abdulla	1 April 2001 (age 25)	Al-Talaba SC (Iraq Stars League) (#19)	Left winger			
**Ali Hayder**	1 October 2005 (age 21)	Al-Talaba SC (Iraq Stars League)	Left winger	175 cm (5 ft 9 in)	Right	
**Masies Artien**	8 August 1993 (age 33)	Al-Talaba SC (Iraq Stars League) (#3)	Centre-back	188 cm (6 ft 2 in)	Right	
**Hiran Ahmed**	6 April 2000 (age 26)	Newroz SC (Iraq Stars League) (#11)	Attacking midfielder	176 cm (5 ft 9 1/2 in)	Right	
**Cardo Siddik**	21 September 2002 (age 24)	Newroz SC (Iraq Stars League) (#5)	Centre-back	190 cm (6 ft 3 in)	Left	
Hady Saleh Karim	11 September 1997 (age 29)	Zakho SC (Iraq Stars League) (#8)	Central midfielder			
**Osama Rashid**	17 January 1992 (age 34)	Zakho SC (Iraq Stars League) (#20)	Defensive midfielder	180 cm (5 ft 11 in)	Right	

== Australia ==
Mario Shabow during his time at Western Sydney Wanderers. Raised in Australia, Shabow was born in Baghdad to Assyrian parents and is yet to represent the national team.

Player	Date of birth	Club	Position	Height	Preferred foot	Refs
Mario Shabow	5 May 1998 (age 28)	Blacktown City FC (#10)	Attacking midfielder	167 cm (5 ft 5 1/2 in)	Right	
**Mohamed Al-Taay**	15 January 2000 (age 26)	Western Sydney Wanderers FC (#6)	Defensive midfielder	176 cm (5 ft 9 1/2 in)	Right	
Ali Auglah	11 March 2002 (age 24)	Rockdale Ilinden FC (#12)	Right-winger	175 cm (5 ft 9 in)	Left	
**Charbel Shamoon**	10 February 2004 (age 22)	Perth Glory FC (#10)	Right-back	175 cm (5 ft 9 in)	Right	
**Aisen Ishak**	13 February 2002 (age 24)	Preston Lions FC	Left-back	183 cm (6 ft 0 in)	Left	
Jason Qariaqus	2006	Western United youth	Left-back			
Frans Deli	8 June 2005 (age 21)	Macarthur youth	Defensive midfielder	170 cm (5 ft 7 in)	Right	
Daniel Sawa	2009	Melbourne City FC youth	Centre-forward			
Ahmed Algarawi	30 October 1998 (age 28)	Mount Druitt Town Rangers	Goalkeeper	183 cm (6 ft 0 in)	Left	

== Belgium ==
Player	Date of birth	Club	Position	Height	Preferred foot	Refs
Mubeen Hamad	2004					
**Ahmed Abdulridha**		Beerschot youth				
**Rayan Oraibi Faraj**		RSD Anderlecht youth				
**Ali Ahmed**		Royal Antwerp youth				
Wissam Ahmed	2010	Oud-Heverlee Leuven youth				

== Canada ==
Player	Date of birth	Club	Position	Height	Preferred foot	Refs
Hazim Hussein Qadheeb	2007	Toronto FC youth	Right-back			

== Cyprus ==
Player	Date of birth	Club	Position	Height	Preferred foot	Refs
**Youssef Amyn**	21 August 2003 (age 23)	AEK Larnaca FC	Left-winger	172 cm (5 ft 7 1/2 in)	Right	

== Czech Republic ==
Player	Date of birth	Club	Position	Height	Preferred foot	Refs
**Merchas Doski**	7 December 1999 (age 26)	FC Viktoria Plzeň (#14)	Left-back	173 cm (5 ft 8 in)	Left	
Ibrahim Aldin	25 April 2002 (age 24)	SK Líšeň (#14)	Central midfielder	175 cm (5 ft 9 in)	Right	
Jakub Yunis	25 March 1996 (age 30)	Unattached	Centre-forward	191 cm (6 ft 3 in)	Right	

== Denmark ==
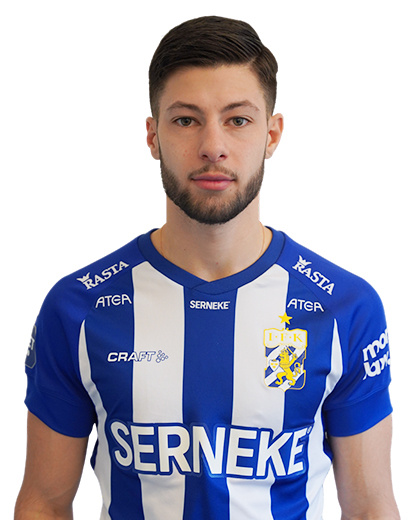
Kevin Yakob pictured in an IFK Göteborg kit. Born in Sweden, Yakob is of Assyrian ethnicity from the city of Mosul and is now in line to represent the national team.

Player	Date of birth	Club	Position	Height	Preferred foot	Refs
**Kevin Yakob**	10 October 2000 (age 26)	AGF (Danish Superliga) (#17)	Attacking midfielder	184 cm (6 ft 1/2 in)	Right	
**Amin Al-Hamawi**	17 December 2003 (age 22)	Randers FC (Danish Superliga) (#9)	Centre-forward	181 cm (5 ft 11 1/2 in)	Right	
Ahmed Hassan	1 January 1997 (age 29)	Hillerød Fodbold (Danish 1st Division) (#16)	Centre-forward	180 cm (5 ft 11 in)	Right	
Matin Al-Atlassi	2 August 1998 (age 28)	Hillerød Fodbold (Danish 1st Division) (#13)	Left-winger			
Simon Sharif	10 November 1997 (age 29)	Hillerød Fodbold (Danish 1st Division) (#18)	Right-back		Right	
Basem Alkhoudari	22 October 2006 (age 20)	HB Køge (Danish 1st Division) (#17)	Right-winger		Left	
Anders Noshe	9 January 2006 (age 20)	Aalborg BK U19 (#30)	Right-winger	174 cm (5 ft 8 1/2 in)	Right	
Ali Al-Najar	23 January 2008 (age 18)	Brøndby IF U17 (#8)	Defensive midfielder	170 cm (5 ft 7 in)	Left	
Zandar Grantzau	27 February 2006 (age 20)	AGF youth	Central midfielder			
Miran Karim	11 March 2007 (age 19)	Nordsjælland youth	Centre-back			
**Mohammad Hassan**	1 April 2002 (age 24)	Ishøj IF (Danish 3rd Division)	Goalkeeper			
Matin Saleh	22 March 2002 (age 24)	Unattached	Right-back		Both	

== Egypt ==
Player	Date of birth	Club	Position	Height	Preferred Foot	Refs
Peter Gwargis	4 September 2000 (age 26)	Ceramica Cleopatra FC (Egyptian Premier League) (#11)	Right winger	180 cm (5 ft 11 in)		

== England ==
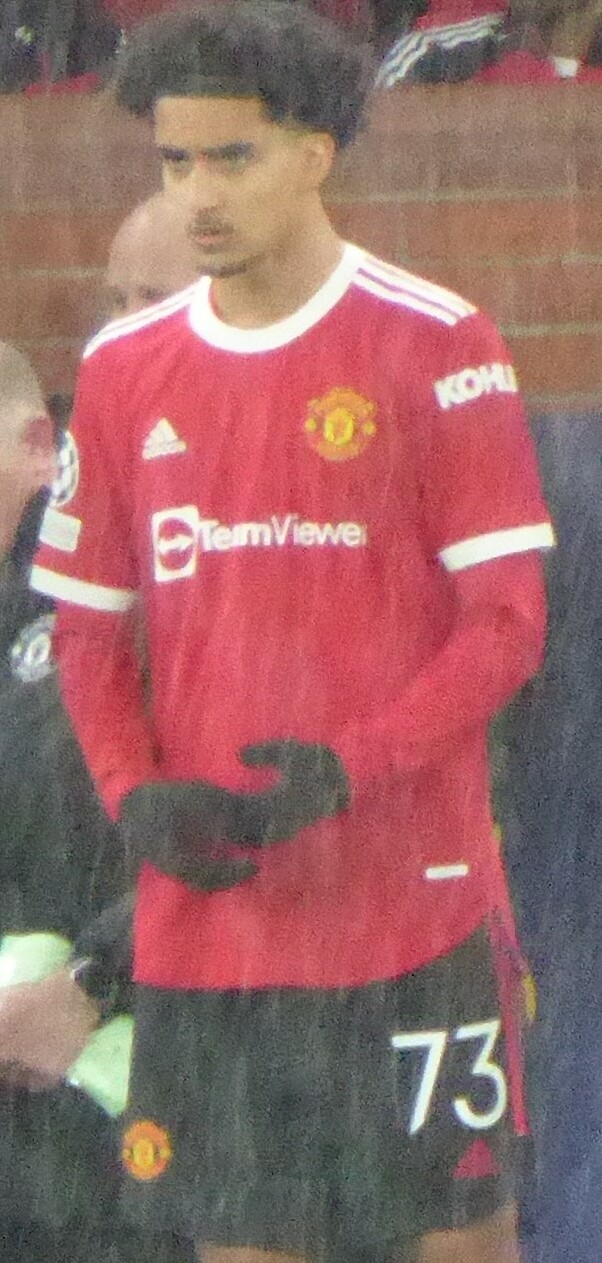
Zidane Iqbal coming on as an 89th-minute substitute for Manchester United in the UEFA Champions League. The central midfielder has maternal roots from the Iraqi city of Samawah and started off representing the Iraqi Olympic team, and has represented the national team 29 times.

Player	Date of birth	Club	Position	Height	Preferred foot	Refs
**Zidane Iqbal**	27 April 2003 (age 23)	Dundee United F.C. (#14)	Central midfielder	181 cm (5 ft 11 1/2 in)	Right	
**Ali Al-Hamadi**	1 March 2002 (age 24)	Ipswich Town F.C. (Premier League) (#16)	Centre-forward	185 cm (6 ft 1 in)	Right	
Ameer Ali	31 August 2008 (age 18)	Bournemouth U21 (Premier League)	Centre-back			
**Botan Ameen**	24 April 2007 (age 19)	Swindon Town U18	Centre-forward		Right	
Moe Shubbar	6 August 2003 (age 23)	Weymouth F.C. (National League South) (#)	Centre-forward	180 cm (5 ft 11 in)	Left	
Valentino Alanezi	6 May 2003 (age 23)	Brentwood Town F.C. (Isthmian League North)	Left-back		Left	
Joseph Khoshaba	16 September 2007 (age 19)	Crystal Palace U18 (U18 Premier League)	Goalkeeper			
Zachariah Hadi	13 February 2006 (age 20)	Bradford City U18	Goalkeeper			
**Zaid Al-Hussaini**	7 June 2000 (age 26)	Unattached	Right-winger	175 cm (5 ft 9 in)	Left	
Jaami Qureshi	2 February 2004 (age 22)	Unattached	Left-winger	176 cm (5 ft 9 1/2 in)	Right	
Hadi Haidar	19 November 2000 (age 25)	Unattached	Defensive midfielder	188 cm (6 ft 2 in)	Right	

== Finland ==
Player	Date of birth	Club	Position	Height	Preferred Foot	Refs
Arjan Goljahanpoor	6 July 1995 (age 31)	JJK Jyväskylä (#9)	Left winger	181 cm (5 ft 11 1/2 in)		
Mustafa Abdulmuttaleb	8 June 2006 (age 20)	HJK Helsinki youth	Left-back			
Arez Ghoshnaw	10 February 2005 (age 21)	FC Honka youth (#75)	Central midfielder			
Ibrahim Mohammed Abdullah		FC Honka youth	Defender			
**Mahmoud Aeisar Mohammed**	2008	Grankulla IFK youth	Forward	186 cm (6 ft 1 in)		
**Qassur Ali**	2007	Käpylän Pallo	Centre-forward			
**Malec Mahdi**	2008	Espoon Palloseura	Central Midfielder	183 cm (6 ft 0 in)		

== Germany ==
Player	Date of birth	Club	Position	Height	Preferred Foot	Refs
Noah Darvich	25 September 2006 (age 20)	VfB Stuttgart (Bundesliga) (#19)	Attacking midfielder	184 cm (6 ft 1/2 in)	Left	
Ameen Al-Dakhil	6 March 2002 (age 24)	VfB Stuttgart (Bundesliga) (#2)	Centre-back	187 cm (6 ft 1 1/2 in)	Right	
Jussef Nasrawe	22 March 2007 (age 19)	Bayern Munich U17	Attacking Midfielder	170 cm (5 ft 7 in)	Left	
**Reber Babir**	2 August 2005 (age 21)	SC Verl youth	Right-winger	177 cm (5 ft 9 1/2 in)	Right	
Rangin Madir Rasho	13 January 2006 (age 20)	FC Ingolstadt 04 youth	Central midfielder			
**Arian Amyn**	1 November 2006 (age 20)	SV Eintracht Hohkeppel	Right-winger		Right	
Yaran Majeed	2006	VFB 03 Hilden youth	Defensive midfielder			
**Sanest Sindi**	20 May 2009 (age 17)	Bayern Munich youth				
Rehan Murad		Bayern Munich youth				
**Marwan Mirza**		Borussia Dortmund youth				
Abbas Haydari		Borussia Mönchengladbach youth				
Oliver Mikhail	9 November 2009 (age 17)	Borussia Mönchengladbach youth	Centre-forward			
Ali Gündogdu	13 September 2001 (age 25)	Optik Rathenow (#10)	Attacking midfielder	175 cm (5 ft 9 in)	Right	
Karsan Doski	2003	VfV 06 Hildesheim (#6)	Central midfielder	170 cm (5 ft 7 in)	Both	
Dlges Abused	2003	SV Werder Bremen III	Left-back			
Sadir Sarim	2006	VfL Oldenburg youth	Centre-back			
Ilyas Al-Saadi	2007	Lopik youth	Defensive midfielder			
Diar Blasini	2008	SV Sandhausen youth	Centre-forward			
Marlon D'Elia	17 April 2007 (age 19)	1.FC Heidenheim U17	Centre-back			
Asil Haidar Ismail	7 February 2003 (age 23)	Unattached	Left-winger		Right	
**Ewert Baram**	17 December 2003 (age 22)	Unattached	Defensive midfielder	177 cm (5 ft 9 1/2 in)	Right	

== Iceland ==
Player	Date of birth	Club	Position	Height	Preferred foot	Refs
Sami Kamel	16 December 1993 (age 32)	Knattspyrnudeild Keflavík (#23)	Attacking midfielder	184 cm (6 ft 1/2 in)	Right	
**Ali Al-Mosawe**	28 January 2002 (age 24)	? loan (#)	Right-winger	167 cm (5 ft 5 1/2 in)	Left	

== Indonesia ==
Player	Date of birth	Club	Position	Height	Preferred foot	Refs
**Frans Putros**	14 July 1993 (age 33)	Persib Bandung	Centre-back	182 cm (5 ft 11 1/2 in)	Right	

== Mexico ==
Player	Date of birth	Club	Position	Height	Preferred Foot	Refs
**Yohan Zetuna**	31 May 2000 (age 26)	Tlaxcala (#22)	Centre-back	184 cm (6 ft 1/2 in)	Right	
**Yousuf Zetuna**	10 March 1999 (age 27)	Unattached	Centre-forward	183 cm (6 ft 0 in)	Right	

== Netherlands ==
Player	Date of birth	Club	Position	Height	Preferred Foot	Refs
**Roman Doulashi**	7 August 2005 (age 21)	Roda U21	Centre-back	193 cm (6 ft 4 in)	Left	
**Arian Sevok**	25 March 1998 (age 28)	NSC Nijkerk (#25)	Goalkeeper	180 cm (5 ft 11 in)	Right	
**Manuel Iylia**	5 May 2004 (age 22)	Unattached	Central midfielder	168 cm (5 ft 6 in)	Right	

== Norway ==
Player	Date of birth	Club	Position	Height	Preferred Foot	Refs
**Mohanad Jeahze**	10 April 1997 (age 29)	Sarpsborg 08 FF (#3)	Left-back	179 cm (5 ft 10 1/2 in)	Left	
**Aimar Sher**	20 December 2002 (age 23)	Sarpsborg 08 FF (#6)	Central midfielder	175 cm (5 ft 9 in)	Right	
**Marko Farji**	16 March 2004 (age 22)	Strømsgodset IF (#21)	Left-winger	184 cm (6 ft 1/2 in)	Right	
Hayder Altai	8 July 1998 (age 28)	Unattached	Centre-back	193 cm (6 ft 4 in)	Right	

== Poland ==
Player	Date of birth	Club	Position	Height	Preferred foot	Refs
**Amir Al-Ammari**	27 July 1997 (age 29)	KS Cracovia (#6)	Central midfielder	182 cm (5 ft 11 1/2 in)	Left	
**Hussein Ali**	1 March 2002 (age 24)	Pogoń Szczecin (#15)	Right-back	183 cm (6 ft 0 in)	Right	

== Portugal ==
Player	Date of birth	Club	Position	Height	Preferred Foot	Refs
Rayan Demirci	11 January 2008 (age 18)	Porto U17	Central midfielder			

== Scotland ==
Player	Date of birth	Club	Position	Height	Preferred foot	Refs
Dario Naamo	14 May 2005 (age 21)	Dundee United F.C. loan (#22)	Right-back	174 cm (5 ft 8 1/2 in)	Right	

== Slovenia ==
Player	Date of birth	Club	Position	Height	Preferred foot	Refs
**Adam Rasheed**	10 July 2006 (age 20)	NK Maribor	Centre-back	183 cm (6 ft 0 in)	Right	

== South Korea ==
Player	Date of birth	Club	Position	Height	Preferred foot	Refs
**Amar Muhsin**	27 December 1997 (age 28)	[[]] ([[]]) (#)	Centre-forward	190 cm (6 ft 3 in)	Left	

== Spain ==
Player	Date of birth	Club	Position	Height	Preferred Foot	Refs
**Ali Mohammad Hatem**	8 November 2002 (age 24)	Las Rozas B	Left-winger	182 cm (5 ft 11 1/2 in)	Right	
Kaleem Shabout	18 January 2001 (age 25)	RSD Alcalá	Centre-back	196 cm (6 ft 5 in)	Right	
Maill Lundgren	1 June 2001 (age 25)	Real Murcia	Midfielder	177 cm (5 ft 9 1/2 in)	Right	

== Sweden ==
Player	Date of birth	Club	Position	Height	Preferred foot	Refs
**Montader Madjed**	7 April 2005 (age 21)	Hammarby IF (Allsvenskan) (#26)	Right-winger	182 cm (5 ft 11 1/2 in)	Left	
**Danilo Al-Saed**	24 February 1999 (age 27)	BK Häcken (Allsvenskan) (#18)	Left-winger	178 cm (5 ft 10 in)	Right	
**Amar Muhsin**	27 December 1997 (age 28)	IK Brage (Superettan) (#33)	Centre-forward	190 cm (6 ft 3 in)	Left	
**Alai Ghasem**	16 February 2003 (age 23)	Örebro SK (Superettan) (#2)	Right-back	184 cm (6 ft 1/2 in)	Right	
**Ahmed Yasin**	22 April 1991 (age 35)	Örebro SK (Superettan) (#99)	Right-winger	184 cm (6 ft 1/2 in)	Right	
**Allan Mohideen**	11 November 1993 (age 33)	Utsiktens BK (Superettan) (#2)	Right-back	176 cm (5 ft 9 1/2 in)	Right	
**Lucas Shlimon**	15 February 2003 (age 23)	Assyriska FF (Ettan) Norra (#6)	Central midfielder		Right	
**Martin Haddad**	8 September 1999 (age 27)	Assyriska FF (Ettan) Norra (#22)	Centre-back	182 cm (5 ft 11 1/2 in)	Right	
Marwan Baze	3 February 1998 (age 28)	IF Sylvia	Central midfielder	183 cm (6 ft 0 in)	Right	
Al-Hussain Shaker		Östers IF youth	Central midfielder		Right	
Ahmed Saeed		Djurgårdens IF youth	Right-winger			
**Hani Nesajer**	10 January 2005 (age 21)	Österlen FF	Goalkeeper			
**Jiloan Hamad**	6 November 1990 (age 36)	Unattached	Central midfielder	173 cm (5 ft 8 in)	Right	
**Sumar Almadjed**	13 March 1996 (age 30)	Unattached	Central midfielder	183 cm (6 ft 0 in)	Right	
**Mustafa Saleh**	27 April 2004 (age 22)	Unattached	Centre-back	192 cm (6 ft 3 1/2 in)	Right	
**Nadeem Omar**	20 August 2001 (age 25)	Unattached	Goalkeeper	187 cm (6 ft 1 1/2 in)	Right	

== Thailand ==
Player	Date of birth	Club	Position	Height	Preferred foot	Refs
**Rebin Sulaka**	12 April 1992 (age 34)	Port F.C.	Centre-back	192 cm (6 ft 3 1/2 in)	Right	

== Turkey ==
Player	Date of birth	Club	Position	Refs
**Ali Ali**	4 January 2005 (age 21)	Esenler Erokspor youth	Goalkeeper	

== United States ==
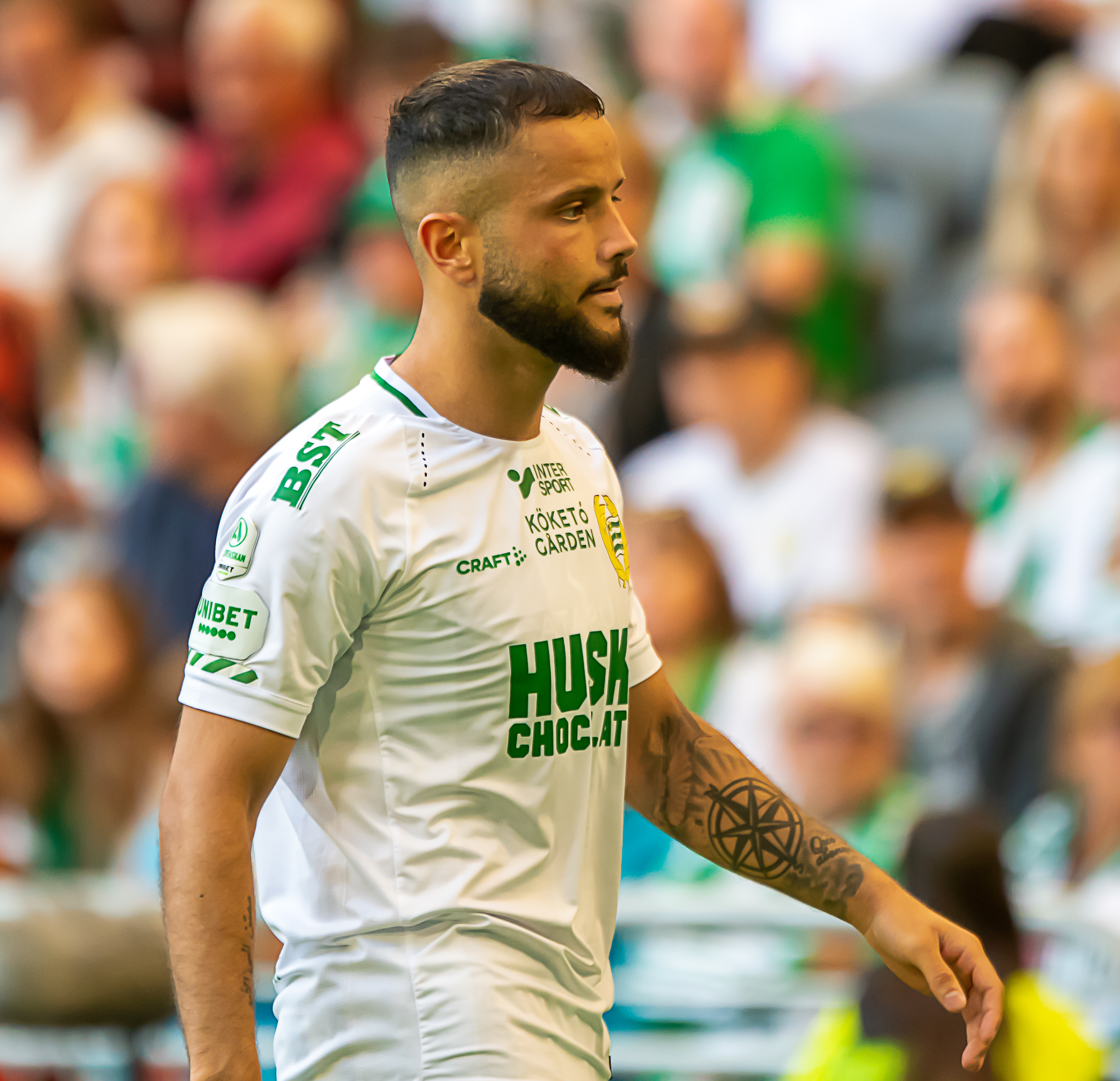
Mohanad Jeahze playing for Hammarby. The left-back has roots from the Iraqi city of Samawah and has represented the national team 4 times.

Player	Date of birth	Club	Position	Height	Preferred foot	Refs
**Justin Meram**	4 December 1988 (age 37)	Michigan Stars FC (NISA) (#19)	Left-winger	185 cm (6 ft 1 in)	Right	
Ahmed Qasem	12 July 2003 (age 23)	Nashville SC (MLS) (#37)	Right-winger	183 cm (6 ft 0 in)	Left	
**Jayddin Nassir**	2009	Slammers FC				

== Retired players ==
These are expatriate Iraqi players formerly selected and now retired.

Player	Date of birth	Int. caps	Int. goals	Position	Height	Preferred foot	Refs
**Anmar Almubaraki**	1 July 1991 (age 35)	1	0	Attacking midfielder	173 cm (5 ft 8 in)	Right	
**Brwa Nouri**	23 January 1987 (age 39)	9	1	Defensive midfielder	177 cm (5 ft 9 1/2 in)	Right	
David Haidar	5 June 1992 (age 34)	0	0	Centre-back	188 cm (6 ft 2 in)	Right	
**Hawbir Mustafa**	23 September 1993 (age 33)	1	0	Right-back	173 cm (5 ft 8 in)	Left	
Kais Al-Ani	29 March 1997 (age 29)	0	0	Goalkeeper	196 cm (6 ft 5 in)	Left	
**Murad Gerdi**	7 March 1986 (age 40)	1	0	Defensive midfielder	174 cm (5 ft 8 1/2 in)	Right	
Rebin Asaad	31 October 1994 (age 32)	0	0	Defensive midfielder	175 cm (5 ft 9 in)	Right	
**Shwan Jalal**	14 August 1983 (age 43)	0	0	Goalkeeper	188 cm (6 ft 2 in)	Left	
**Yaser Kasim**	10 May 1991 (age 35)	21	3	Central midfielder	181 cm (5 ft 11 1/2 in)	Right	
