= Murad Gerdi =

Iraqi-Austrian footballer

Personal information
- Date of birth: 7 March 1986 (age 40)
- Place of birth: Götzis, Austria
- Height: 1.74 m (5 ft 9 in)
- Position: Midfielder

Team information
- Current team: Egg
- Number: 4

Youth career
- 1993–1995: Koblach
- 1995–1999: Austria Lustenau
- 1999–2000: Götzis
- 2000–2004: Austria Lustenau

Senior career*
Years	Team	Apps	(Gls)
2004–2008	Austria Lustenau II	74	(12)
2006–2008	Austria Lustenau	24	(0)
2008–2009	Hard	27	(7)
2009–2011	Al-Tilal	54	(4)
2011–2014	Duhok	80	(6)
2014–2015	Erbil	35	(4)
2016	Hard	11	(0)
2016–2024	Egg	122	(15)
Total		427	(48)

International career
2011	Iraq	1	(0)
- * Club domestic league appearances and goals as of 16:45, 24 March 2024 (UTC)

Murad Gerdi (Arabic: مُرَاد كُرْدِيّ; born 7 March 1986) is a professional footballer who plays as a midfielder for Egg. Born in Austria, he played for the Iraq national team.

== Career ==
In 2009, Gerdi signed for Yemeni side Al-Tilal.

== Career statistics ==
=== Club ===
As of 22 October 2021

Appearances and goals by club, season and competition
Club	Season	League			Cup		Other		Total	
Club	Season	Division	Apps	Goals	Apps	Goals	Apps	Goals	Apps	Goals
Austria Lustenau II	2004–05	Austrian Landesliga	3	0	–		0	0	3	0
Austria Lustenau II	2005–06	Austrian Regionalliga	27	2	–		0	0	27	2
Austria Lustenau II	2006–07	Austrian Regionalliga	20	4	–		0	0	20	4
Austria Lustenau II	2007–08	Austrian Landesliga	24	6	–		0	0	24	6
Austria Lustenau II	Total		74	12	0	0	0	0	74	12
Austria Lustenau	2005–06	Erste Liga	6	0	0	0	0	0	6	0
Austria Lustenau	2006–07	Erste Liga	11	0	0	0	0	0	11	0
Austria Lustenau	2007–08	Erste Liga	7	0	0	0	0	0	7	0
Austria Lustenau	Total		24	0	0	0	0	0	24	0
Hard	2008–09	Austrian Regionalliga	27	7	0	0	0	0	27	7
Hard	2015–16	Austrian Regionalliga	11	0	0	0	0	0	11	0
Hard	Total		38	7	0	0	0	0	38	7
Egg	2016–17	Austrian Landesliga	28	10	0	0	0	0	28	10
Egg	2017–18	Austrian Landesliga	28	7	0	0	0	0	28	7
Egg	2018–19	Austrian Landesliga	28	7	0	0	0	0	28	7
Egg	2021–22	Austrian Regionalliga	15	5	0	0	0	0	15	5
Egg	Total		99	29	0	0	0	0	99	29
Career total			235	48	0	0	0	0	235	48

=== International ===
As of 22 October 2021.

National team	Year	Apps	Goals
Iraq	2011	1	0
Total		1	0
