= SV Stripfing =

Austrian football club, based in Weikendorf

Coordinates: 48.343000°N 16.797391°E

- Full name: Sportverein Stripfing
- Short name: SVS
- Founded: 2 August 1951; 75 years ago
- Stadium: Sportplatz Stripfing; Weikendorf, Lower Austria
- Capacity: 500
- President: Johann Schuller
- 2025–26: 2. Liga, withdrew
- Website: https://www.sv-stripfing.at/
| Home colours | Away colours |

Sportverein Stripfing, known simply as SV Stripfing, is an inactive Austrian football club based in Weikendorf, Lower Austria, in the district of Gänserndorf. The club is affiliated to the Lower Austrian Football Association (NÖFV) and played in the Austrian 2. Liga from the 2023–24 season until November 2025.

== History ==
SV Stripfing was founded in 1951. Without any significant success, the first 50 years were spent in the depths of the Lower Austrian House of Commons. Stripfing finished the 2007–08 season in sixth place in the 2nd division, the eighth highest division and the lowest for the Stripfing area. In the 2008–09 season, they finished in 15th place and were penultimate. They finished the 2009–10 season in tenth place out of twelve clubs. In the 2010–11 season, they were runners-up in the 2nd class Marchfeld B behind SV Gänserndorf. In the 2011–12 season, they were able to become champions of the 2nd class Marchfeld without defeat and thus rise to the seventh-class 1st class.

In the first season in the 1st Class North they also did not lose a single game and were promoted to the sixth highest division, the Gebietsliga, as champions in 2013. There they were able to continue their run of success and as champions of the Gebietsliga Nord/Nordwest they were promoted to the 2nd Landesliga after only one season in 2014. This was also the end of the march of stripfing, the 2014–15 season ended in fifth place in the 2nd Landesliga Ost, four points behind champions FCM Traiskirchen.

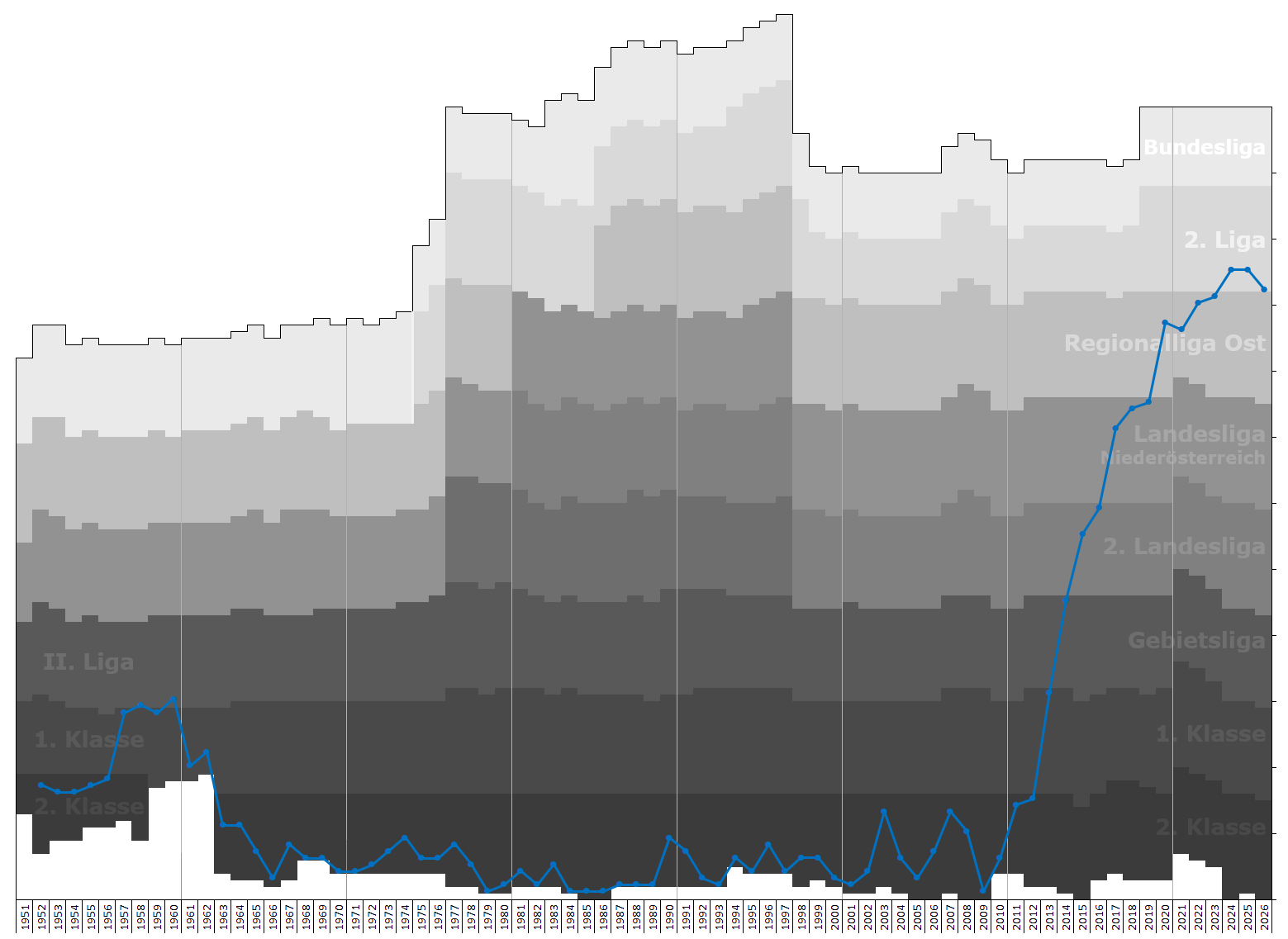
Historical chart of the club's league performance

In the 2015–16 season, however, they were able to become champions with a five-point lead over pursuers ASK-BSC Bruck/Leitha and thus enter the Landesliga. In their first season in the fourth-highest division, they finished fifth in the table, but they had nothing to do with promotion, 20 points behind champions Bruck/Leitha. However, they won the Lower Austrian Cup that season after winning the final against ASK Ybbs and were thus represented in the ÖFB-Cup for the first time in the 2017/18 season. There they were eliminated in the first round by the second division club SC Austria Lustenau. In the league, they narrowly missed out on the championship title in the 2017–18 season: tied on points with SV Leobendorf, the goal difference decided in favor of Leobendorf.

=== Promotion to the Regionalliga Ost ===
In the 2018–19 season, the Marchfelder secured the championship title in the Landesliga under coach Erwin Cseh with only two defeats with a lead of 13 points over Kremser SC. They were promoted to the Regionalliga Ost.

After Stripfing needed a second team for the regional league, a syndicate was formed with FC Angern, which takes part in the championship in the 1st class north (7th level).

On 12 May 2023, the first championship title in the regional league was decided with a win over the second-placed TWL Elektra in Draßburg. SV Stripfing has received a license for the Austrian Football Second League and will play in the Austrian second tier in 2023-24 for the first time in the club's history.

=== 2. Liga and insolvency ===
Stripfing fell into financial difficulty during the 2025–26 season after insolvency proceedings were opened against their principal backer Erich Kirisits in July 2025. Most of the squad terminated their contracts over unpaid wages at the end of October 2025, leaving the club unable to field a side for its fixture at SKU Amstetten on 7 November. The Landesgericht Korneuburg opened bankruptcy proceedings on 10 November 2025 on the application of a creditor, with thirty creditors claiming a total of €565,000. Two days later the club returned the licence it had been granted for the season and left the 2. Liga with immediate effect, and all thirteen matches it had played were annulled.

At the first creditors' meeting on 3 December 2025 the club put forward a restructuring plan, stating that it would close its professional operation and continue at amateur level, with its youth teams and a youth academy run jointly with SC Wiener Neustadt remaining in place. Creditors accepted the plan on 27 May 2026, under which 20% of the recognised claims are to be paid in four instalments over two years. The club made no application for readmission to the Lower Austrian league system and was left out of the divisional allocation published for the 2026–27 season.

== Achievements ==
- 2011–12 Champion of the 2nd class Marchfeld and promotion to the 1st class north (7th level)
- 2012–13 Champion of the 1st Class North and promotion to the Regional League North/Northwest (6th level)
- 2013–14 Champion of the Regional League North/Northwest and promotion to the 2nd Landesliga Ost (5th level)
- 2015–16 Champion of the 2nd Landesliga Ost and promotion to the 1st Landesliga (4th level)
- 2018–19 Champion of the 1st Landesliga and promotion to the Regionalliga Ost (3rd level)
- 2022–23 Champion of the Regionalliga Ost and promotion to the 2nd League (2nd level)
