= 2007–08 Austrian Football First League =

Austrian Football First League
- Season: 2007–08
- Promoted: Kapfenberger SV
- Relegated: FC Kärnten; SC-ESV Parndorf; SV Bad Aussee
- Matches: 198
- Goals: 592 (2.99 per match)

The 2007–08 Austrian Football First League season was the 34th season of second-level league football in Austria. It was the sixth season that it used the name Red Zac First League.

== Final standings ==
Pos	Team	Pld	W	D	L	GF	GA	GD	Pts	Promotion or relegation
1	Kapfenberger SV (C, P)	33	19	9	5	79	45	+34	66	Promotion to 2008–09 Austrian Bundesliga
2	FC Gratkorn	33	15	10	8	51	35	+16	55	
3	SC Austria Lustenau	33	15	9	9	59	45	+14	54	
4	FC Lustenau	33	15	8	10	50	39	+11	53	
5	Austria Wien II	33	14	8	11	45	44	+1	50	
6	Red Bull Salzburg II	33	13	7	13	51	52	−1	46	
7	SC Schwanenstadt (Note: SC Schwanenstadt sold their license to FC Magna for 2008/09 and will play in the 2.Klasse (lowest level) next season.)	33	13	6	14	48	51	−3	45	
8	DSV Leoben	33	11	8	14	44	46	−2	41	
9	SK Schwadorf (Note: ASK Schwadorf were renamed SK Schwadorf Admira during the winter break.)	33	12	5	16	48	53	−5	41	
10	FC Kärnten (R)	33	11	7	15	37	51	−14	40	Relegated to 2008–09 Austrian Regionalliga
11	SC-ESV Parndorf (R)	33	10	7	16	45	61	−16	37	Relegated to 2008–09 Austrian Regionalliga
12	SV Bad Aussee (R)	33	4	8	21	35	70	−35	20	Relegated to 2008–09 Austrian Regionalliga

Source: Weltfussball.de
(C) Champions; (P) Promoted; (R) Relegated

== Results ==
Last updated 8 November 2007

Home \ Away	SCS	DSV	AUS	GRA	FCL	KÄR	FAK	PAR	KSV	SCH	BAD	RBS
SC Schwanenstadt		1–1	2–3	0–0		4–2	2–0		1–3		2–3	4–2
DSV Leoben	1–0		1–0	2–3	2–1	4–0	0–2	0–0				1–3
SC Austria Lustenau	3–2	2–0		0–0		0–0	1–1		3–2	5–1	2–1	
FC Gratkorn	3–0	2–0	3–1		1–1			2–2		3–1	4–1	1–2
FC Lustenau	1–0	2–1	1–1			4–0	1–1	4–1	1–1	3–0		
FC Kärnten	0–1			1–2	4–1		0–2		0–3	0–2	2–2	0–1
FK Austria Wien Amateure		2–1		0–0	0–1			2–2	2–2	2–1	2–1	5–1
SC/ESV Parndorf	1–4		0–4		1–1	4–0			1–3	1–1	2–0	
SV Kapfenberg		4–2		4–1	2–1	4–1	1–1	1–4			3–1	1–1
ASK Schwadorf	2–4	2–2	1–3			2–0	1–3	1–2	5–0			3–2
SV Bad Aussee		2–5	0–1	0–0	1–2	1–3		2–3		1–2		3–2
Red Bull Salzburg Amateure	0–1		2–1	3–0	2–2			2–2	0–2	3–2	2–0	

Legend: Blue = home team win; Yellow = draw; Red = away team win.

== Top goal scorers ==
Last updated 8 November 2007

	Player		Team	Goals
1	(Austria)	Günter Friesenbichler	SC Austria Lustenau	10
1	(Austria)	Rene Gartler	FC Lustenau	10
1	(Austria)	Michael Liendl	SV Kapfenberg	10
4	(Austria)	Andreas Bammer	SC Schwanenstadt	8
5	(Nigeria)	Frank Egharevba	ASK Schwadorf	7
5	(North Macedonia)	Mensur Kurtisi	SC/ESV Parndorf	7
5	(Greece)	Georges Panagiotopoulos	FC Gratkorn	7
8	(Austria)	Boris Hüttenbrenner	DSV Leoben	6
8	(Austria)	Rubin Okotie	FK Austria Wien Amateure	6
8	(Austria)	Rene Schicker	DSV Leoben	6
8	(Austria)	Daniel Sobkova	SC Austria Lustenau	6
