= 2006–07 Austrian Football First League =

Austrian Football First League
- Season: 2006–07
- Promoted: LASK Linz
- Relegated: VfB Admira Wacker Mödling; TSV Hartberg
- Matches: 198
- Goals: 585 (2.95 per match)

The 2006–07 Austrian First League (known as the Erste Liga due to sponsorship) was the 33rd Second division season. In this season, the league was expanded to 12 teams from the previous season's number of 10 teams. This meant that the previous Promotion/relegation play-off system no longer existed and all three Regionalliga Champions would now be automatically promoted while the bottom three finishers in the First League would now be relegated directly as well. Games for this season began on the 1 August 2006 and concluded on the 25 May 2007 with the Champions LASK Linz winning the League by a comfortable 13 points over second placed, SC Schwanenstadt.

== Team movements ==
=== Promoted to Bundesliga ===
- SC Rheindorf Altach

=== Relegated from Bundesliga ===
- VfB Admira Wacker Mödling

=== Promoted from Regionalliga ===
- FC Lustenau
- SC-ESV Parndorf 1919
- TSV Hartberg^{1}

=== Relegated to Regionalliga ===
- FC Kufstein

== Teams ==
Club Name	Stadium	Capacity
Austria Lustenau	Reichshofstadion	12,500
FK Austria Wein Amateurs	Franz Horr Stadium	11,800
DSV Leoben	Donawitz Stadium	6,000
FC Gratkorn	Sportstadion Gratkorn	3,000
FC Kärnten	Hypo-Arena	32,000
FC Lustenau	Reichshofstadion	12,500
Kapfenberger SV	Franz Fekete Stadion	12,000
LASK Linz	Linzer Stadion	14,000
SC-ESV Parndorf 1919	Heidobodenstadion	5,000
SC Schwanenstadt	Stadium Vor Der Au	5,000
TSV Hartberg	Stadion Hartberg	6,000
VfB Admira Wacker Mödling	Bundesstadion Südstadt	12,000

== Table ==
Pos	Team	Pld	W	D	L	GF	GA	GD	Pts	Promotion or relegation
1	LASK Linz (C, P)	33	24	4	5	74	34	+40	76	Promotion to 2007–08 Austrian Bundesliga
2	SC Schwanenstadt	33	19	6	8	59	41	+18	63	
3	DSV Leoben	33	14	13	6	55	36	+19	55	
4	Austria Lustenau	33	13	11	9	57	50	+7	50	
5	FC Gratkorn	33	13	8	12	45	41	+4	47	
6	FC Lustenau	33	12	11	10	54	51	+3	47	
7	FC Kärnten	33	11	9	13	41	41	0	42	
8	FK Austria Wien Amateurs	33	10	8	15	42	52	−10	38	
9	SC-ESV Parndorf 1919	33	9	8	16	41	47	−6	35	
10	VfB Admira Wacker Mödling (R)	33	8	9	16	45	67	−22	33	Relegation to 2007–08 Austrian Regionalliga
11	Kapfenberger SV	33	8	8	17	41	60	−19	32	
12	TSV Hartberg (R)	33	7	5	21	31	65	−34	26	Relegation to 2007–08 Austrian Regionalliga

Source: Weltfussball.de
Rules for classification: 1) points; 2) goal difference; 3) number of goals scored.
(C) Champions; (P) Promoted; (R) Relegated
