= Fernando Troyansky =

Argentine footballer

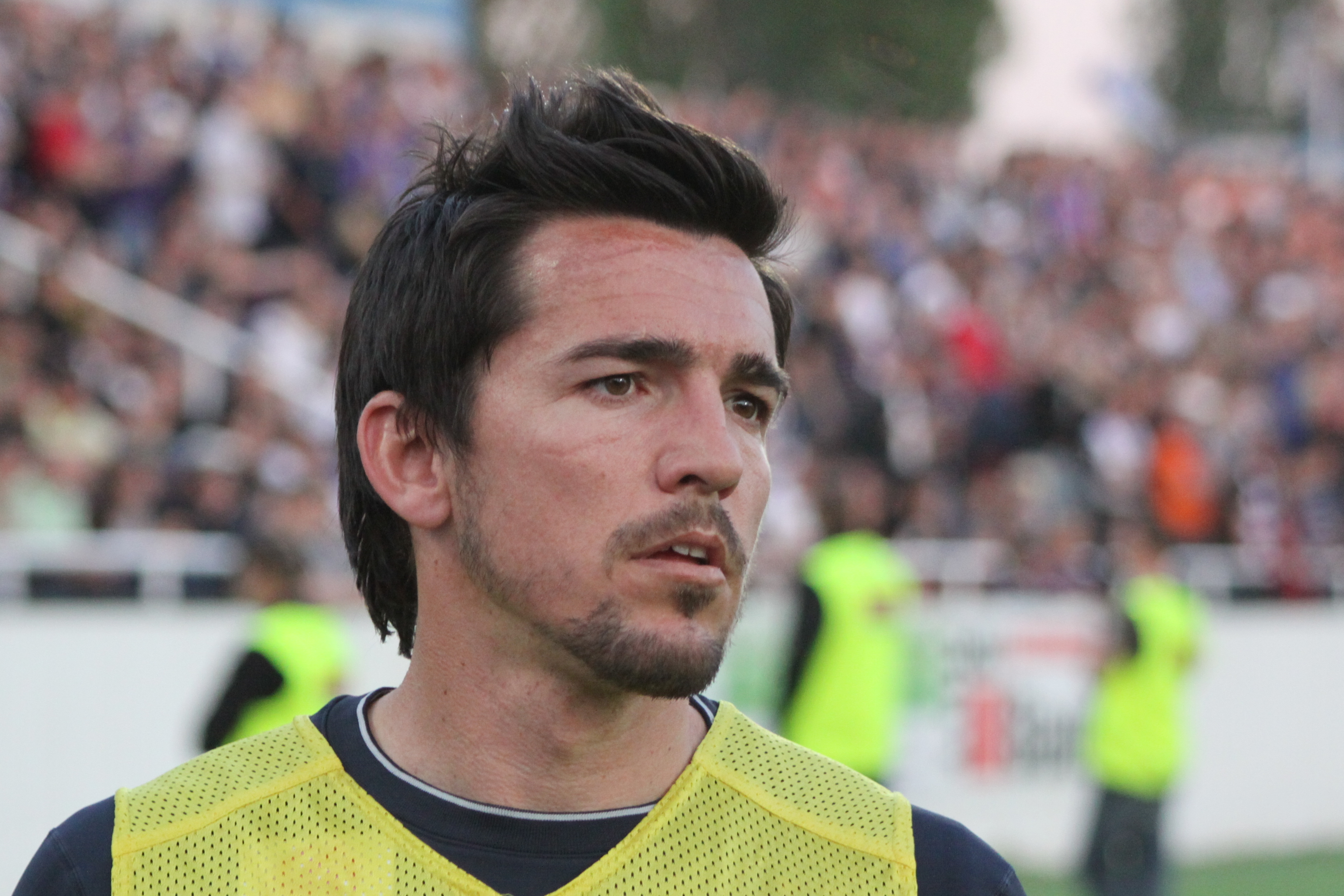
- Troyansky with Austria Wien

Personal information
- Full name: Fernando Ariel Troyansky
- Date of birth: 24 November 1977 (age 48)
- Place of birth: Bahía Blanca, Argentina
- Height: 1.78 m (5 ft 10 in)
- Position: Defender

Youth career
- Olimpo

Senior career*
Years	Team	Apps	(Gls)
1995–2000	Olimpo	101	(3)
2000	Los Andes	10	(1)
2001–2009	Austria Wien	138	(5)
2002–2003	→ Admira Wacker (loan)	26	(4)
2009–2010	SK Austria Kärnten	15	(1)
2010–2011	Austria Wien	2	(0)
2011–2012	SC Wiener Neustadt	5	(0)
2012–2013	FAC Team für Wien	9	(0)
2013	SV Leobendorf	14	(1)
- * Club domestic league appearances and goals

Fernando Ariel Troyansky (born 24 November 1977) is an Argentine former professional footballer who played as a defender.

== Career ==
Troyansky was born in Bahía Blanca. He started his career with his local team Club Olimpo in 1995, playing for five years in Torneo Argentino A and Primera B Nacional leagues. In 2000, he moved to Club Atlético Los Andes of the Primera Division Argentina and in 2001 he went to Austria to join the Austria Vienna. In 2009, he moved to the FC Kärnten where he regained the opportunity of being in a team's start line-up.

After one unsuccessful season back in Austria Vienna, he moved to SC Wiener Neustadt, facing the challenge to avoid relegation from the Austrian Football Bundesliga.

Troyansky retired at the end of the 2013 season.

== Honours ==
Austria Wien

- Austrian Football Bundesliga: 2005–06
- Austrian Cup: 2004–05, 2005–06, 2006–07, 2008–09
