= 2006–07 Austrian Football Bundesliga =

95th season of top-tier football league in Austria

Austrian Bundesliga
- Season: 2006–07
- Dates: 18 July 2006 – 20 May 2007
- Champions: FC Red Bull Salzburg
- Matches: 180
- Goals: 491 (2.73 per match)

The 2006–07 Austrian Football Bundesliga was the 95th season of top-tier football in Austria. The competition is officially called T-Mobile Bundesliga, named after the Austrian branch of German mobile phone company T-Mobile. The season started on 18 July 2006, and the 36th and last round of matches took place on 20 May 2007.

== League table ==
Pos	Team	Pld	W	D	L	GF	GA	GD	Pts	Qualification or relegation
1	Red Bull Salzburg (C)	36	22	9	5	70	23	+47	75	Qualification to Champions League second qualifying round
2	Ried	36	15	11	10	47	42	+5	56	Qualification to UEFA Cup first qualifying round
3	Mattersburg	36	16	7	13	61	58	+3	55	Qualification to UEFA Cup first qualifying round
4	Rapid Wien	36	14	10	12	55	49	+6	52	Qualification to Intertoto Cup second round
5	Pasching (D)	36	14	10	12	47	41	+6	52	Dissolved
6	Austria Wien	36	11	12	13	43	43	0	45	Qualification to UEFA Cup second qualifying round (Note: Austria Wien won the 2006–07 Austrian Cup and therefore qualified for the second qualifying round of the UEFA Cup.)
7	Sturm Graz	36	16	6	14	40	40	0	41 (Note: Sturm Graz were deducted 13 points.)	
8	Rheindorf Altach	36	11	5	20	45	64	−19	38	
9	Wacker Tirol	36	8	10	18	40	64	−24	34	
10	Grazer AK (D, R)	36	8	10	18	43	67	−24	6 (Note: Grazer AK were deducted 28 points.)	Relegation to Austrian Regional League Central (Note: Grazer AK were relegated to Austrian Regional League Central, instead of Austrian First League because they went into administration.)

Source: weltfussball.de (in German)
Rules for classification: 1) points; 2) goal difference; 3) number of goals scored.
(C) Champions; (D) Disqualified; (R) Relegated

== Results ==
Teams played each other four times in the league. In the first half of the season each team played every other team twice (home and away), and then did the same in the second half of the season.

=== First half of season ===
Home \ Away	ALT	AWI	GAK	MAT	PAS	RWI	RIE	RBS	STU	TIR
Rheindorf Altach		1–0	4–1	0–2	2–3	3–1	0–0	0–2	4–1	0–1
Austria Wien	2–0		0–0	3–1	1–1	0–0	1–1	1–1	1–1	4–1
Grazer AK	1–1	1–3		0–2	2–1	1–1	2–2	0–2	0–0	2–1
Mattersburg	6–3	1–0	2–1		0–2	1–0	0–0	2–1	1–4	1–1
Pasching	4–2	2–0	1–0	1–2		1–0	0–0	1–1	1–0	0–2
Rapid Wien	3–2	1–1	1–4	4–1	1–1		2–2	1–1	4–1	1–1
Ried	1–2	1–0	1–1	6–2	1–1	1–0		0–3	2–1	0–1
Red Bull Salzburg	3–0	4–0	4–1	2–0	3–0	4–0	1–1		2–0	4–0
Sturm Graz	2–0	1–0	0–2	0–0	0–0	2–0	1–0	2–1		2–3
Wacker Tirol	0–1	1–1	1–1	2–1	0–0	2–2	1–2	2–1	2–0	

Source: weltfussball.de (in German)
Legend: Blue = home team win; Yellow = draw; Red = away team win.

=== Second half of season ===
Home \ Away	ALT	AWI	GAK	MAT	PAS	RWI	RIE	RBS	STU	TIR
Rheindorf Altach		0–1	3–1	3–2	3–2	2–1	0–2	0–2	1–3	2–0
Austria Wien	3–0		2–2	1–1	2–0	2–1	2–1	0–2	0–1	4–1
Grazer AK	4–1	2–1		3–3	2–1	0–2	2–3	0–0	0–2	3–2
Mattersburg	2–1	3–1	5–1		2–4	1–0	1–2	2–1	1–0	6–1
Pasching	1–1	2–1	3–0	2–0		0–1	3–1	0–1	1–1	3–1
Rapid Wien	2–1	3–0	1–0	2–2	2–0		5–2	2–2	3–0	2–1
Ried	2–0	1–0	3–1	1–0	2–1	1–2		0–1	2–1	2–1
Red Bull Salzburg	1–1	2–2	2–1	1–1	2–3	3–1	2–0		3–1	3–0
Sturm Graz	1–0	0–1	1–0	3–1	2–1	1–0	1–1	0–2		2–0
Wacker Tirol	1–1	2–2	5–1	1–3	0–0	2–3	0–0	0–2	0–2	

Source: weltfussball.de (in German)
Legend: Blue = home team win; Yellow = draw; Red = away team win.

== Top goalscorers ==
Rank	Scorer	Club	Goals
1	(Germany) Alexander Zickler	Red Bull Salzburg	22
2	(Brazil) Leo da Silva	SC Rheindorf Altach	14
3	(Croatia) Mate Bilić	Rapid Wien	11
3	(Austria) Christian Mayrleb	ASKÖ Pasching	11
5	(Austria) Herwig Drechsel	SV Ried	10
5	(Austria) Michael Mörz	SV Mattersburg	10
5	(Austria) Thomas Wagner	SV Mattersburg	10
8	(Austria) Johannes Aigner	Austria Wien	9
8	(Austria) Rene Aufhauser	Red Bull Salzburg	9

== Attendances ==
#	Club	Average
1	Salzburg	15,109
2	Rapid	14,572
3	Mattersburg	9,974
4	Sturm	9,546
5	Austria	6,227
6	GAK	5,807
7	Altach	5,407
8	Wacker	5,384
9	Ried	4,445
10	Pasching	3,745
