= 2025–26 Austrian Football Second League =

48th season of the Austrian second-level football league

Austrian Football Second League
- Season: 2025–26
- Dates: 1 August 2025 - 14 May 2026
- Promoted: Austria Lustenau
- Relegated: Austria Klagenfurt (administrative relegation); SV Stripfing (excluded)
- Matches: 124
- Goals: 328 (2.65 per match)
- Top goalscorer: David Peham (15 goals)
- Biggest home win: Admira 6–1 Kapfenberg (5 December 2025)
- Biggest away win: Liefering 0–4 Lustenau (1 August 2025); Klagenfurt 0–4 Admira (29 August 2025); Stripfing 0–4 Rapid Wien II (1 November 2025)
- Highest scoring: Sturm Graz II 4–4 Stripfing (9 August 2025)
- Longest winning run: St. Pölten (5)
- Longest unbeaten run: Admira (15)
- Longest winless run: Schwarz-Weiß Bregenz (13)
- Longest losing run: Sturm Graz II (5)

The 2025–26 Austrian Football Second League, also known as the Admiral 2nd League for sponsorship purposes, is the 52nd season of the Austrian second-level football league and the eighth as the Second League. The league consists of 16 teams.

== Teams ==
Sixteen teams are participating in the 2025–26 season. Austria Klagenfurt was relegated from the Bundesliga in 2024–25 season, replacing last year's 2nd League champion SV Ried. Moving up from the lower divisions are Austria Wien II, promoted from the Austrian Regionalliga East, Austria Salzburg, promoted from the Austrian Regionalliga West and Hertha Wels, promoted from the Austrian Regionalliga Central.

Austria Wien II and Austria Salzburg return to the second tier after two and ten years absence, respectively, while Hertha Wels will play in 2nd League for the first time in their history for this season.

The league finished with only 15 teams as SV Stripfing ceased operations in early November due to financial woes.

Location of teams in the 2025–26 Austrian Football Second League

Club Name	City	Stadium	Capacity
Admira Wacker	Maria Enzersdorf	Datenpol Arena	10,600
SKU Ertl Glas Amstetten	Amstetten	Ertl Glas Stadion	2,000
SK Austria Klagenfurt	Klagenfurt	28 Black Arena	32,000
SC Austria Lustenau	Lustenau	Planet Pure Stadion	5,138
SV Austria Salzburg	Salzburg	Max Aicher Stadion	1,566
Austria Wien II	Vienna	Generali Arena	17,500
Schwarz-Weiß Bregenz	Bregenz	ImmoAgentur Stadion	12,000
First Vienna FC 1894	Vienna	Hohe Warte Stadium	5,500
FAC WIEN	Vienna	FAC-Platz	3,000
KSV 1919	Kapfenberg	Franz Fekete Stadium	10,000
FC Liefering	Salzburg	Untersberg-Arena	4,128
SK Rapid II	Vienna	Allianz Stadion	28,345
Sturm Graz II	Graz	Merkur Arena	16,364
SKN St. Pölten	Sankt Pölten	NV Arena	8,000
SV Stripfing	Weikendorf	Sportplatz Stripfing	500
FC HOGO Hertha Wels	Wels	Huber Arena	3,000

== League table ==
Pos	Team	Pld	W	D	L	GF	GA	GD	Pts	Promotion or relegation
1	Austria Lustenau (C, P)	28	16	6	6	40	26	+14	54	Promotion to 2026–27 Austrian Football Bundesliga
2	SKN St. Pölten	28	16	5	7	44	26	+18	53	
3	FAC Wien	28	14	6	8	42	18	+24	48	
4	Admira Wacker	28	12	12	4	50	29	+21	48	
5	FC Liefering	28	13	8	7	47	41	+6	47	
6	Ertl Glas Amstetten	28	11	11	6	41	34	+7	44	
7	First Vienna FC 1894	28	11	7	10	30	25	+5	40	
8	Austria Wien II	28	11	6	11	33	40	−7	39	
9	Austria Salzburg	28	9	10	9	36	37	−1	37	
10	FC HOGO Hertha Wels	28	9	6	13	36	37	−1	33	
11	SK Rapid II	28	9	5	14	33	45	−12	32	
12	Austria Klagenfurt (Note: Austria Klagenfurt received a three-point deduction and a €44,000 fine due to a late submission of their consolidated financial statement for the past fiscal year.) (R)	28	9	6	13	33	44	−11	30	Relegation to 2026–27 Austrian Football Regionalliga
13	Kapfenberger SV	28	8	4	16	31	53	−22	28	
14	SK Sturm Graz II	28	5	6	17	25	45	−20	21	
15	Schwarz-Weiß Bregenz (Note: Schwarz-Weiß Bregenz began the season with a three point deduction and a fine of 20,000 Euros, imposed in the licensing procedure for the late submission of their audited annual accounts.)	28	3	10	15	36	57	−21	16	
16	SV Stripfing (Note: Stripfing returned their licence with immediate effect on 12 November 2025 after entering insolvency, and all thirteen matches they had played were annulled.) (F)	0	0	0	0	0	0	0	0	Licence returned and all results annulled

Source: 2.Liga Table
Rules for classification: 1) Points; 2) Direct Duel; 3) Goal difference; 4) Goals scored; 5) Matches won; 6) Away matches won; 7) Away goals scored
(C) Champions; (F) Forfeit; (P) Promoted; (R) Relegated

== Results ==
Home \ Away	ADM	AMS	AUK	AUL	AUS	AUW	BRE	FVI	FAC	KAP	LIE	RAP	STU	STP	STR	WEL
Admira Wacker	—	2–2	3–3	1–1	4–0	2–1	2–2	0–0	1–0	6–1	4–0	0–3	2–1	2–1	N/A	1–0
Ertl Glas Amstetten	2–1	—	3–0	1–0	0–2	1–1	2–3	0–0	1–1	3–0	2–2	3–1	2–0	3–3	3–0	1–1
Austria Klagenfurt	0–4	0–2	—	3–0	0–1	2–3	2–1	0–2	0–3	1–0	2–3	2–1	0–0	1–2	N/A	2–0
Austria Lustenau	1–1	2–1	2–1	—	0–0	3–2	2–0	0–3	0–0	2–1	1–0	3–0	2–1	3–0	3–3	1–0
Austria Salzburg	0–0	2–2	1–2	2–2	—	2–0	2–2	0–0	0–1	1–0	2–0	4–2	1–2	1–2	N/A	4–2
Austria Wien II	1–1	0–0	2–1	3–1	1–1	—	2–1	1–1	0–5	1–2	0–2	1–0	0–1	1–4	1–1	1–0
Schwarz-Weiß Bregenz	1–4	0–2	1–1	1–2	0–0	2–2	—	3–0	1–1	1–1	2–2	1–2	1–3	2–1	N/A	2–3
First Vienna FC 1894	1–3	2–3	0–2	1–1	3–0	0–2	2–0	—	0–2	1–2	0–0	2–0	2–1	2–1	N/A	1–0
FAC WIEN	1–1	5–0	1–2	0–2	1–2	2–1	2–0	0–1	—	2–0	2–0	0–1	0–1	0–0	N/A	3–1
Kapfenberger SV	0–2	0–0	1–1	3–1	4–1	1–2	3–1	0–3	0–0	—	1–4	0–2	2–1	0–3	N/A	3–2
FC Liefering	3–0	0–1	2–2	0–4	3–2	2–0	4–3	1–0	3–1	5–2	—	1–0	2–2	3–1	0–0	2–5
SK Rapid II	2–2	4–1	2–1	1–2	1–1	0–2	3–1	1–0	0–2	1–0	1–1	—	1–1	0–2	N/A	1–4
SK Sturm Graz II	1–1	3–3	1–1	0–1	0–2	1–2	3–1	0–2	0–2	1–2	0–1	1–2	—	0–1	4–4	0–3
SKN St. Pölten	0–0	1–3	2–0	1–0	2–1	2–0	4–2	2–1	0–2	2–1	0–0	4–0	4–0	—	3–1	1–0
SV Stripfing	0–1	N/A	0–1	N/A	N/A	N/A	3–0	0–2	N/A	0–1	N/A	0–4	N/A	N/A	—	4–3
FC HOGO Hertha Wels	1–0	1–0	1–2	0–1	1–1	0–1	1–1	0–0	0–3	3–1	1–1	3–2	2–0	1–1	N/A	—

Source: soccerway.com
Legend: Blue = home team win; Yellow = draw; Red = away team win.

== Positions by round ==
Team ╲ Round	1	2	3	4	5	6	7	8	9	10	11	12	13	14	15	16	17	18	19	20	21	22	23	24	25	26	27	28	29	30
SKN St. Pölten	2	1	1	1	1	1	1	1	1	1	1	1	1	1	1	1	1	5	5	4	5	4	3	1	2	2	2	3	2	2
SKU Ertl Glas Amstetten	6	6	6	10	9	8	8	5	6	3	4	5	5	4	3	4	2	4	2	1	4	5	5	4	4	5	5	5	5	5
Admira Wacker	4	5	5	2	2	2	2	4	2	2	2	2	3	2	2	2	3	1	3	3	1	3	4	5	5	4	4	4	4	3
SC Austria Lustenau	1	2	4	5	7	4	4	6	3	5	3	3	2	3	5	5	4	2	4	5	3	1	1	2	1	1	1	1	1	1
Floridsdorfer AC	3	3	2	3	3	6	6	9	7	4	5	4	4	5	4	3	5	3	1	2	2	2	2	3	3	3	3	2	3	4
Austria Wien II	14	7	7	6	4	5	5	2	4	6	7	9	7	7	6	6	6	7	7	7	6	6	6	6	6	6	7	7	7	8
FC Liefering	16	11	12	11	11	10	10	10	11	11	11	8	6	6	7	7	7	6	6	6	7	7	7	7	7	7	6	6	6	6
Austria Salzburg	10	15	11	9	8	11	11	11	10	10	9	11	10	9	10	8	8	9	9	9	8	9	8	9	9	9	9	9	9	9
First Vienna FC	5	4	3	4	6	7	7	7	8	8	8	10	11	8	8	9	9	8	8	8	9	9	8	8	8	8	8	8	8	7
SK Rapid II	8	8	14	15	15	15	15	13	12	12	13	12	12	13	13	10	10	10	12	13	11	11	10	10	11	11	12	12	12	11
Austria Klagenfurt	7	12	8	7	10	9	9	3	5	7	6	6	8	10	9	11	11	11	13	11	13	13	13	13	12	13	11	10	11	12
Kapfenberger SV	11	13	9	8	5	3	3	8	9	9	10	7	9	11	11	12	12	12	10	10	12	12	12	12	13	12	13	13	13	13
FC HOGO Hertha Wels	15	14	10	12	12	12	12	14	15	14	14	14	13	12	12	13	13	13	11	13	12	10	10	10	10	10	10	11	10	10
SK Sturm Graz II	12	10	13	14	14	14	14	16	14	15	15	15	14	14	14	14	14	14	14	14	14	14	14	14	14	14	14	14	14	14
Schwarz-Weiß Bregenz	9	16	16	16	16	16	16	15	16	16	16	16	15	15	15	15	15	15	15	15	15	15	15	15	15	15	15	15	15	15
SV Stripfing	13	9	15	13	13	13	13	12	13	13	12	13	16	16	16	16	16	16	16	16	16	16	16	16	16	16	16	16	16	16

Promotion to Austrian Bundesliga
Relegation to Austrian Regionalliga

Updated to match(es) played on 14 May 2026. Source: 2liga.at

== Results by round ==
Team ╲ Round	1	2	3	4	5	6	7	8	9	10	11	12	13	14	15	16	17	18	19	20	21	22	23	24	25	26	27	28	29	30
Admira Wacker	W	D	D	W	W	D	D	D	W	W	W	D	W	W	D	W	L	W	L	D	W	L	D	X	D	D	W	D	L	W
SKU Ertl Glas Amstetten	W	D	L	D	D	W	W	D	D	W	D	W	W	W	W	D	W	D	W	L	L	D	D	W	L	L	D	X	W	L
SK Austria Klagenfurt	W	L	W	W	L	W	W	W	L	D	D	W	L	L	D	L	L	X	D	D	L	L	W	L	W	D	W	W	L	L
SC Austria Lustenau	W	W	L	D	D	W	D	D	W	L	W	W	W	D	L	W	W	W	X	L	W	W	D	L	W	W	L	W	D	W
SV Austria Salzburg	L	L	W	W	D	L	L	D	W	L	W	L	L	D	X	W	D	D	L	W	W	L	D	D	D	D	W	W	D	X
Austria Wien II	L	W	D	W	W	D	W	D	L	D	L	L	L	W	W	L	W	L	W	W	W	L	D	W	X	D	L	L	D	L
Schwarz-Weiß Bregenz	D	L	D	L	D	D	L	D	L	L	D	D	L	L	W	L	W	L	D	L	L	X	D	L	W	L	L	L	D	L
First Vienna FC	W	W	L	D	D	D	L	W	L	W	L	L	D	W	L	X	D	W	L	W	L	W	L	W	W	D	D	W	L	W
FAC	W	W	D	L	W	L	D	L	W	W	D	W	W	X	D	W	D	W	W	L	W	L	W	L	L	W	D	W	X	L
Kapfenberger SV	L	L	W	W	W	W	L	L	L	D	D	W	L	L	L	L	D	L	W	X	L	D	W	L	L	W	L	L	L	W
FC Liefering	L	D	D	D	D	W	D	D	D	L	W	W	W	L	D	L	W	W	W	W	L	L	X	L	W	D	W	W	W	W
SK Rapid II	D	D	L	L	L	L	D	W	W	L	L	W	W	L	D	W	L	D	L	L	W	W	L	W	L	L	X	L	W	W
SK Sturm Graz II	L	D	D	L	L	L	L	L	W	L	D	D	L	L	D	D	X	L	L	W	L	W	L	W	L	D	L	L	L	L
SKN St. Pölten	W	W	W	D	W	W	W	W	W	W	L	L	L	W	D	W	L	L	L	W	X	W	W	W	L	D	D	D	W	W
SV Stripfing	L	D	L	D	L	L	W	D	L	D	W	L	L	F	F	F	F	F	F	F	F	F	F	F	F	F	F	F	F	F
FC HOGO Hertha Wels	L	L	W	L	L	L	D	L	L	W	L	D	D	W	D	L	L	D	W	L	W	W	L	D	W	X	W	D	W	D

Updated to match(es) played on 14 May 2026. Source: 2liga.at
W = Win; D = Draw; L = Lose; F = Forfeit; X = Exempt
- In italics : matches from Stripfing before their forfeit.

== Season statistics ==
As of 14 May 2026

=== Top scorers ===
Rank	Player	Club	Goals
1	(Austria) David Peham	Amstetten	15
2	(Austria) Phillip Verhounig	Liefering	13
3	(Austria) Bernhard Zimmermann	First Vienna	12
4	(Austria) Albin Gashi	FC HOGO Hertha Wels	11
4	(Austria) Alexander Schmidt	Admira Wacker	11
4	(Austria) Johannes Tartarotti	Bregenz	11
4	(Austria) Lukas Gabbichler	FAC	11
8	(Austria) Marco Hausjell	St. Pölten	10
8	(Austria) Philipp Hosiner	Austria Wien II	10
10	(Germany) Marc Stendera	St. Pölten	9
10	(Croatia) Bartol Barišić	Klagenfurt	9
10	(Austria) Luca Hassler	Kapfenberg	9
10	(Zambia) Jack Lahne	Austria Lustenau	9

== See also ==
- 2025–26 Austrian Football Bundesliga
- 2025–26 Austrian Cup
