= Gerdi =

Gerdi may refer to:

== People with the surname, given name or nickname ==
- Murad Gerdi (born 1986), Austrian footballer
- Gerdi E. Lipschutz (1923–2010), American politician
- Gerd Springer (1927–1999), known as Gerdi, Austrian footballer and ice hockey player
- Gerdi Verbeet (born 1951), Dutch former politician

== Other uses ==
- Gerdî, a Kurdish tribe
