= 2005–06 Austrian Football First League =

Austrian Football First League
- Season: 2005–06
- Promoted: SC Rheindorf Altach
- Relegated: FC Kufstein
- Matches: 180
- Goals: 494 (2.74 per match)

The 2005–06 Austrian Football First League season was the 32nd season of second level league football in Austria. It was the fourth season that it used the name Red Zac First League.

== Team movements ==
=== Promoted to Bundesliga ===
- SV Ried

=== Relegated from Bundesliga ===
- No Teams were relegated^{1}

=== Promoted from Regionalliga ===
- SC Schwanenstadt
- FK Austria Wein Amateurs
- FC Kufstein^{1}

=== Relegated to Regionalliga ===
- SC Untersiebenbrunn
- SV Wörgl

^{1}SC Bregenz resigned from the Bundesliga and were relegated to the Regionalliga. This left an extra place in the 1st Division which FC Kufstein filled.

== Teams ==
Club Name	Stadium	Capacity
Austria Lustenau	Reichshofstadion	12,500
FK Austria Wein Amateurs	Franz Horr Stadium	11,800
DSV Leoben	Donawitz Stadium	6,000
FC Gratkorn	Sportstadion Gratkorn	3,000
FC Kärnten	Hypo-Arena	32,000
FC Kufstein	Kufstein Arena	4,500
Kapfenberger SV	Franz Fekete Stadion	12,000
LASK Linz	Linzer Stadion	14,000
SC Rheindorf Altach	Stadion Schnabelholz	8,900
SC Schwanenstadt	Stadion Vor der Au	5,000

== Table ==
Pos	Team	Pld	W	D	L	GF	GA	GD	Pts	Promotion or relegation
1	SC Rheindorf Altach (C, P)	36	20	8	8	61	35	+26	68	Promotion to 2006–07 Austrian Bundesliga
2	LASK Linz	36	19	9	8	51	30	+21	66	
3	Austria Lustenau	36	17	11	8	54	32	+22	62	
4	FK Austria Wein Amateurs	36	16	10	10	58	40	+18	58	
5	FC Gratkorn	36	14	12	10	47	40	+7	54	
6	DSV Leoben	36	14	9	13	59	49	+10	51	
7	FC Kärnten	36	15	6	15	57	50	+7	51	
8	Kapfenberger SV	36	10	9	17	51	69	−18	39	
9	SC Schwanenstadt	36	9	6	21	33	57	−24	33	
10	FC Kufstein (R)	36	4	4	28	23	92	−69	16	Relegation to 2006–07 Austrian Regionalliga

Source: Weltfussball.de
Rules for classification: 1) points; 2) goal difference; 3) number of goals scored.
(C) Champions; (P) Promoted; (R) Relegated
