= 2. Liga (Austria) =

Association football league

Coordinates: 48.2489°N 16.3597°E

- Organising body: Österreichische Fußball Bundesliga
- Founded: 1974; 52 years ago
- Country: Austria
- Number of clubs: 16
- Level on pyramid: 2
- Promotion to: Bundesliga
- Relegation to: Austrian Regionalliga
- Domestic cup: Austrian Cup
- Current champions: Austria Lustenau (3rd title) (2025–26)
- Website: www.2liga.at
- Current: 2026–27 Austrian Football Second League

The Second League (German: 2. Liga), officially known as Admiral 2. Liga for sponsorship reasons, is the second-highest professional division in Austrian football.

The division currently contains 16 teams, and the champion of the league is promoted to the Austrian Bundesliga if it is not a reserve team. The three bottom teams are directly relegated from the Second League into the Regional leagues.

== Teams ==
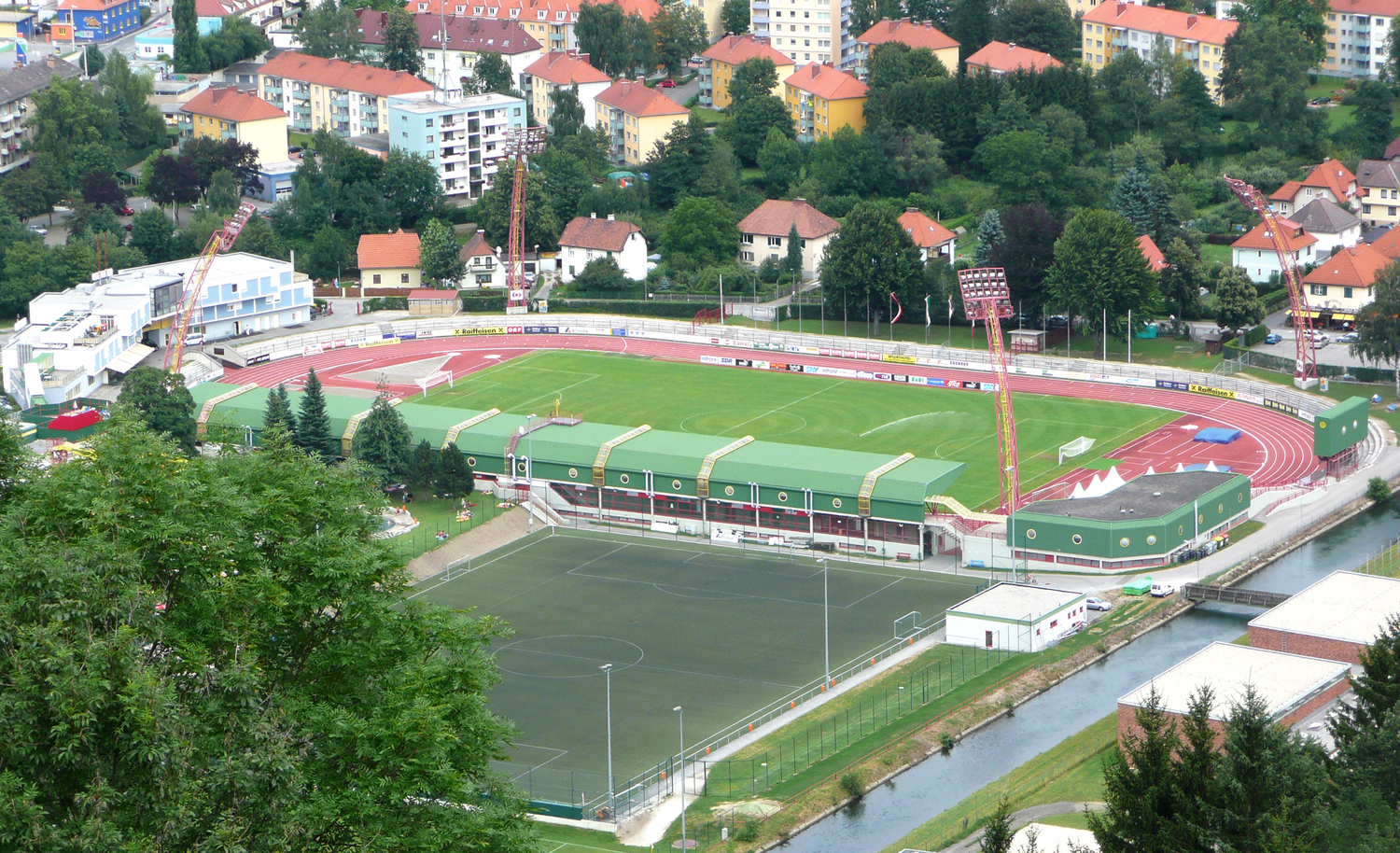
Kapfenberger SV's ground, the Franz Fekete Stadium (formerly Alpenstadion)

Starting in the 2018–19 season, the former First League changed its name to the Second League and expanded from ten teams to 16 teams.

Sixteen teams will participate in the 2025–26 season: twelve teams from the previous season, one team relegated from Bundesliga and three teams promoted from Regionalliga. Austria Klagenfurt were relegated from the 2024–25 Austrian Football Bundesliga. While, Young Violets Austria Wien, Hertha Wels and Austria Salzburg were promoted from the 2024–25 Austrian Regionalliga, respectively.

Location of teams in the 2025–26 Austrian Football Second League

Club Name	City	Stadium	Capacity
Admira Wacker	Mödling	Datenpol Arena	10,600
Austria Klagenfurt	Klagenfurt am Wörthersee	Wörthersee Stadion	30,000
Austria Lustenau	Lustenau	Reichshofstadion	5,138
Austria Salzburg	Salzburg	Max Aicher Stadion	1,566
First Vienna	Vienna	Naturarena Hohe Warte	7,200
Floridsdorfer AC	Vienna	FAC-Platz	3,000
FC Hertha Wels	Wels	Huber-Arena Wels	3,000
Kapfenberger SV	Kapfenberg	Franz-Fekete-Stadion	12,000
FC Liefering	Salzburg	EM Stadion Wals-Siezenheim	4,128
Rapid Wien II	Vienna	Allianz Stadion	28,000
Sturm Graz II	Graz	Merkur Arena	15,323
SKN St. Pölten	Sankt Pölten	NV Arena	8,000
SKU Amstetten	Amstetten	Ertl Glas Stadion	2,000
SV Stripfing	Weikendorf	FAC-Platz	3,000
SW Bregenz	Bregenz	ImmoAgentur Stadion	12,000
Young Violets Austria Wien	Vienna	Generali Arena	17,500

== Relegation ==
The destination of a club relegated from the Second League depends upon which Land (state) of the Federal Republic it is a member. The relegated clubs join one of the Regionalligen (regional leagues) in the east, centre or west of the country. The three regional league champions are promoted to the Second League. Participation in the professional Second League is conditional on their licensing by the fifth senate of the federal league. If the licence is refused for economic reasons, one team fewer will be relegated.

== Past winners ==
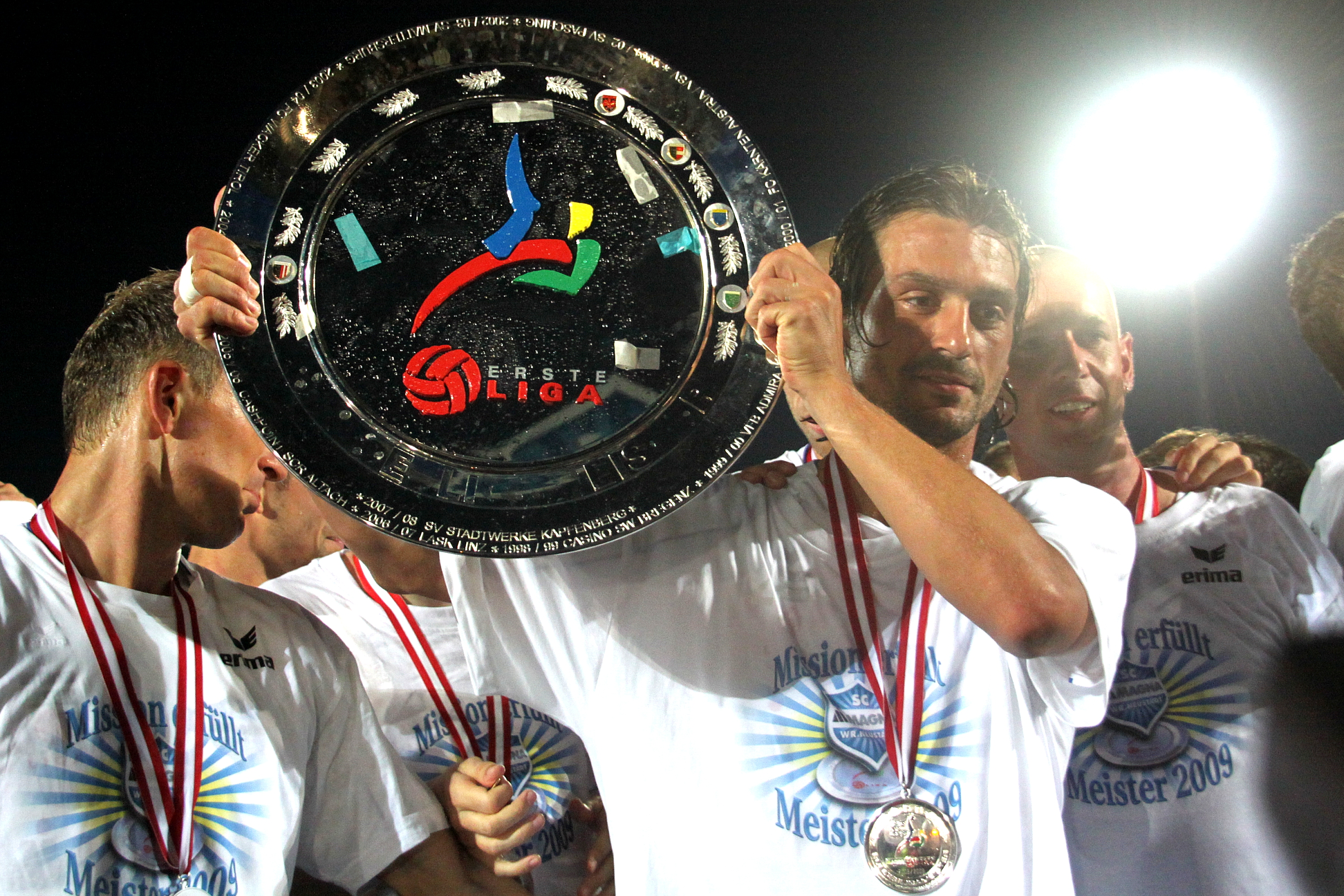
Sanel Kuljić of SC Wiener Neustadt lifts the Erste Liga trophy in 2009

- 1974–75: Grazer AK
- 1975–76: First Vienna FC
- 1976–77: Wiener Sport-Club
- 1977–78: SV Austria Salzburg
- 1978–79: Linzer ASK
- 1979–80: SC Eisenstadt
- 1980–81: FC Wacker Innsbruck
- 1981–82: Austria Klagenfurt
- 1982–83: SV Sankt Veit
- 1983–84: SV Spittal/Drau
- 1984–85: Salzburger AK 1914
- 1985–86: Wiener Sport-Club
- 1986–87: SV Austria Salzburg
- 1987–88: Kremser SC
- 1988–89: Kremser SC
- 1989–90: SV Spittal/Drau
- 1990–91: VfB Mödling
- 1991–92: Linzer ASK
- 1992–93: Grazer AK
- 1993–94: Linzer ASK
- 1994–95: Grazer AK
- 1995–96: FC Linz
- 1996–97: SC Austria Lustenau
- 1997–98: SK Vorwärts Steyr
- 1998–99: Schwarz-Weiß Bregenz
- 1999–2000: VfB Admira Wacker Mödling
- 2000–01: FC Kärnten
- 2001–02: ASKÖ Pasching
- 2002–03: SV Mattersburg
- 2003–04: FC Wacker Tirol
- 2004–05: SV Ried
- 2005–06: SC Rheindorf Altach
- 2006–07: LASK
- 2007–08: Kapfenberger SV
- 2008–09: SC Wiener Neustadt
- 2009–10: FC Wacker Innsbruck
- 2010–11: FC Admira Wacker Mödling
- 2011–12: Wolfsberger AC
- 2012–13: SV Grödig
- 2013–14: SC Rheindorf Altach
- 2014–15: SV Mattersburg
- 2015–16: SKN St. Pölten
- 2016–17: LASK
- 2017–18: FC Wacker Innsbruck
- 2018–19: WSG Swarovski Tirol
- 2019–20: SV Ried
- 2020–21: FC Blau-Weiß Linz
- 2021–22: SC Austria Lustenau
- 2022–23: FC Blau-Weiß Linz
- 2023–24: Grazer AK
- 2024–25: SV Ried
- 2025–26: SC Austria Lustenau

== Performance by club ==
Club	Winners	Championship seasons
LASK	5	1978–79, 1991–92, 1993–94, 2006–07, 2016–17
Grazer AK	4	1974–75, 1992–93, 1994–95, 2023–24
FC Wacker Innsbruck (2002)	3	2003–04, 2009–10, 2017–18
SV Ried	3	2004–05, 2019–20, 2024–25
SC Austria Lustenau	3	1996–97, 2021–22, 2025–26
Wiener Sport-Club	2	1976–77, 1985–86
Austria Salzburg	2	1977–78, 1986–87
Kremser SC	2	1987–88, 1988–89
SV Spittal/Drau	2	1983–84, 1989–90
Austria Klagenfurt / FC Kärnten	2	1981–82, 2000–01
FC Admira Wacker Mödling	2	1999–00, 2010–11
SC Rheindorf Altach	2	2005–06, 2013–14
SV Mattersburg	2	2002–03, 2014–15
FC Blau-Weiß Linz	2	2020–21, 2022–23
First Vienna	1	1975–76
SC Eisenstadt	1	1979–80
FC Wacker Innsbruck	1	1980–81
SV Sankt Veit	1	1982–83
Salzburger AK 1914	1	1984–85
VfB Mödling	1	1990–91
FC Linz	1	1995–96
SK Vorwärts Steyr	1	1997–98
Schwarz-Weiß Bregenz	1	1998–99
ASKÖ Pasching	1	2001–02
Kapfenberger SV	1	2007–08
SC Wiener Neustadt	1	2008–09
WAC	1	2011–12
Grödig	1	2012–13
SKN St. Pölten	1	2015–16
WSG Swarovski Tirol	1	2018–19

== Name history ==
The Austrian second division has had several different names and sponsors since 1974. It was formerly called the First League (Erste Liga), from 2002 to 2018.

(Seasons below represent the first season when the name was used)

- 1974/75 Nationalliga
- 1975/76 2. Division
- 1993/94 2. Division der Bundesliga
- 1998/99 Erste Division
- 2002/03 Red Zac-Erste Liga
- 2008/09 ADEG Erste Liga
- 2010/11 „Heute für Morgen“ Erste Liga
- 2014/15 Sky Go Erste Liga
- 2018/19 2. Liga
- 2021/22 Admiral 2. Liga

The league was known as the Sky Go Erste Liga for sponsorship reasons from 2014/15 to 2017/18, but Sky is not mentioned on the official website 2liga.at, or in the ÖFB's 2018/19 preview articles.
