= 2005–06 Austrian Football Bundesliga =

88th season of top-tier football league in Austria

Austrian Bundesliga
- Season: 2005–06
- Dates: 12 July 2005 – 13 May 2006
- Champions: FK Austria Wien
- Matches: 180
- Goals: 472 (2.62 per match)

Statistics of Austrian Football Bundesliga in the 2005–06 season.

== Overview ==
It was contested by 10 teams, and FK Austria Wien won the championship.

== League standings ==
Pos	Team	Pld	W	D	L	GF	GA	GD	Pts	Qualification or relegation
1	Austria Wien (C)	36	19	10	7	51	33	+18	67	Qualification to Champions League third qualifying round
2	Red Bull Salzburg	36	20	3	13	62	42	+20	63	Qualification to Champions League second qualifying round
3	Pasching	36	16	10	10	43	32	+11	58	Qualification to UEFA Cup first round
4	Ried	36	13	13	10	48	47	+1	52	Qualification to Intertoto Cup second round
5	Rapid Wien	36	13	10	13	51	41	+10	49	
6	Grazer AK	36	13	6	17	47	48	−1	45	
7	Mattersburg	36	12	8	16	40	54	−14	44	Qualification to UEFA Cup second qualifying round (Note: Champions League-bound Austria Wien won the 2005–06 Austrian Cup, so cup runners-up Mattersburg will enter the second qualifying round of UEFA Cup.)
8	Sturm Graz	36	10	12	14	44	51	−7	42	
9	Wacker Tirol	36	10	12	14	44	55	−11	42	
10	Admira Wacker Mödling (R)	36	9	6	21	42	69	−27	33	Relegation to Austrian First Football League

Source: weltfussball.de (in German)
Rules for classification: 1) points; 2) goal difference; 3) number of goals scored.
(C) Champions; (R) Relegated

== Results ==
Teams played each other four times in the league. In the first half of the season each team played every other team twice (home and away), and then did the same in the second half of the season.

=== First half of season ===
Home \ Away	ADM	AWI	GAK	MAT	PAS	RWI	RBS	RIE	STU	TIR
Admira Wacker Mödling		1–2	1–2	1–2	1–2	1–1	0–4	2–2	2–3	5–2
Austria Wien	2–1		3–2	3–0	0–2	0–2	2–0	2–0	2–1	0–0
Grazer AK	4–1	1–0		1–0	0–0	1–1	3–1	2–2	2–0	1–1
Mattersburg	3–1	1–2	3–1		0–0	0–0	0–1	4–3	1–1	0–0
Pasching	5–0	0–1	1–0	2–0		2–0	1–0	0–0	2–2	2–3
Rapid Wien	0–1	3–1	3–2	1–2	2–0		2–3	2–2	2–3	2–0
Red Bull Salzburg	3–2	1–0	1–0	4–0	1–0	0–2		2–0	3–0	2–0
Ried	4–0	0–0	2–1	3–2	0–0	2–2	3–0		2–1	0–0
Sturm Graz	2–1	0–0	0–2	0–2	2–0	2–2	0–0	3–1		0–0
Wacker Tirol	1–0	2–2	0–1	4–2	2–2	0–3	3–0	1–1	0–2	

Source: weltfussball.de (in German)
Legend: Blue = home team win; Yellow = draw; Red = away team win.

=== Second half of season ===
Home \ Away	ADM	AWI	GAK	MAT	PAS	RWI	RBS	RIE	STU	TIR
Admira Wacker Mödling		0–1	2–0	0–1	2–1	2–1	0–3	0–0	2–0	1–1
Austria Wien	4–4		2–1	1–0	1–1	3–1	2–2	3–0	0–0	2–1
Grazer AK	3–0	0–0		3–0	1–2	3–1	3–1	1–4	2–3	0–1
Mattersburg	3–2	0–2	1–0		1–2	0–0	2–1	3–1	1–1	2–2
Pasching	0–3	2–0	1–0	2–0		1–0	0–0	0–1	3–1	1–1
Rapid Wien	0–1	0–3	2–0	2–0	3–1		0–1	6–0	3–1	2–1
Red Bull Salzburg	0–1	3–0	5–0	3–1	1–2	2–0		3–0	3–2	5–2
Ried	2–0	0–0	2–1	2–2	1–2	0–0	2–1		2–0	3–0
Sturm Graz	1–1	1–3	0–0	0–1	1–1	0–0	4–0	1–0		2–3
Wacker Tirol	4–0	0–2	1–3	2–0	1–0	0–0	3–2	0–1	2–4	

Source: weltfussball.de (in German)
Legend: Blue = home team win; Yellow = draw; Red = away team win.

== Top goalscorers ==
Rank	Scorer	Club	Goals
1	(Austria) Sanel Kuljic	SV Ried	15
1	(Austria) Roland Linz	Austria Wien	15
3	(Croatia) Mario Bazina	Grazer AK/Rapid Wien	11
3	(Austria) Marc Janko	Red Bull Salzburg	11
3	(Czech Republic) Marek Kincl	Rapid Wien	11
3	(Austria) Michael Mörz	SV Mattersburg	11
7	(Austria) Muhammet Akagündüz	Rapid Wien	9
7	(North Macedonia) Ilčo Naumoski	SV Mattersburg	9
7	(Democratic Republic of the Congo) Olivier Nzuzi	Sturm Graz	9
7	(Austria) Thomas Pichlmann	ASKÖ Pasching	9
7	(Norway) Sigurd Rushfeldt	Austria Wien	9
7	(Germany) Alexander Zickler	Red Bull Salzburg	9

== Attendances ==
#	Club	Average
1	Salzburg	13,683
2	Rapid	12,398
3	Mattersburg	9,749
4	Sturm	8,330
5	GAK	7,372
6	Austria	7,357
7	Ried	5,068
8	Wacker	5,023
9	Pasching	4,093
10	Admira	3,571
