= Yousuf Zetuna =

Iraqi footballer

Personal information
- Full name: Yousuf Salwan Zetuna
- Date of birth: 10 March 1999 (age 27)
- Place of birth: Tel Keppe, Ninawa, Iraq
- Height: 1.85 m (6 ft 1 in)
- Position: Forward

Youth career
- Vardar Academy
- 2016–2019: Oaxaca

Senior career*
Years	Team	Apps	(Gls)
2019–2020	Alebrijes de Oaxaca	0	(0)
2020	La Piedad	2	(0)
2020–2021	Saltillo	6	(1)
2021	Alebrijes de Oaxaca	1	(0)
2022	Kastrioti	6	(0)

International career
2021	Iraq U23	1	(0)
- * Club domestic league appearances and goals as of 8 September 2024

Yousuf Salwan Zetuna (Arabic: يوسف زيتونة; born 10 March 1999) is an Iraqi professional footballer.

== Early life ==
Born in Tel Keppe in the Nineveh Governorate of Iraq, Zetuna is one of four brothers, including fellow footballer Yohan Zetuna, and has one sister. Due to the family being Catholic, they faced religious persecution in Iraq, and fled initially to Turkey, living in a United Nations refugee camp. After ten months in Turkey, the family moved to Michigan in the United States on 15 May 2009. In 2016, the family relocated to Oaxaca, Mexico, as one of Zetuna's uncles was living there.

== Club career ==
Having initially played football in the refugee camp in Turkey, and then for the Vardar Academy in Rochester, Michigan, Zetuna joined the academy of professional side Alebrijes de Oaxaca in 2016, appearing in a number of pre-season friendlies for the side. As he was seventeen when he joined, Zetuna was unable to sign a professional contract until February 2019, when he and Yohan were also registered for the Clausura 2019.

He made his professional debut in the Copa MX on 7 September 2019, coming on as a substitute for Adrián Marín in a 4–1 loss to Deportivo Toluca. Following one more Copa MX appearance, he left the club for Liga Premier de México side La Piedad, but only made two league appearances before the COVID-19 pandemic struck and the season was terminated.

He joined fellow Liga Premier side Saltillo in August 2020, and went on to score his first goal in senior football on the first matchday of the season; the equaliser in a 2–2 draw against Mineros de Fresnillo on 18 September. After five more appearances, Zetuna returned to Oaxaca, now playing in the newly-formed Liga de Expansión MX, in January 2021.

Zetuna made one appearance for Oaxaca, coming on as a late substitute for Julio Cruz in a 2–0 loss to Cimarrones, before his contract expired in May 2021. He signed for Albanian Kategoria Superiore side Kastrioti in January 2022, going on to make eight appearances in all competitions before leaving the club at the end of the year.

== International career ==
Zetuna was called up to the Iraq under-23 squad in August 2021. He made one appearance for the nation, in a 4–1 friendly loss to the United Arab Emirates.

== Career statistics ==
=== Club ===
As of 8 September 2024.

Appearances and goals by club, season and competition
Club	Season	League			Cup		Other		Total	
Club	Season	Division	Apps	Goals	Apps	Goals	Apps	Goals	Apps	Goals
Oaxaca	2019–20	Ascenso MX	0	0	2 (Note: Appearances in the Copa MX)	0	0	0	2	0
La Piedad	2020–21	Liga Premier - Serie A	2	0	0	0	0	0	2	0
Saltillo	2020–21	Liga Premier - Serie A	6	1	0	0	0	0	6	1
Oaxaca	2020–21	Liga de Expansión MX	1	0	0	0	0	0	1	0
Kastrioti	2021–22	Kategoria Superiore	6	0	2 (Note: Appearances in the Albanian Cup)	0	0	0	8	0
Career total			15	1	4	0	0	0	19	1
