= Georges Panagiotopoulos =

Belgian footballer (born 1975)

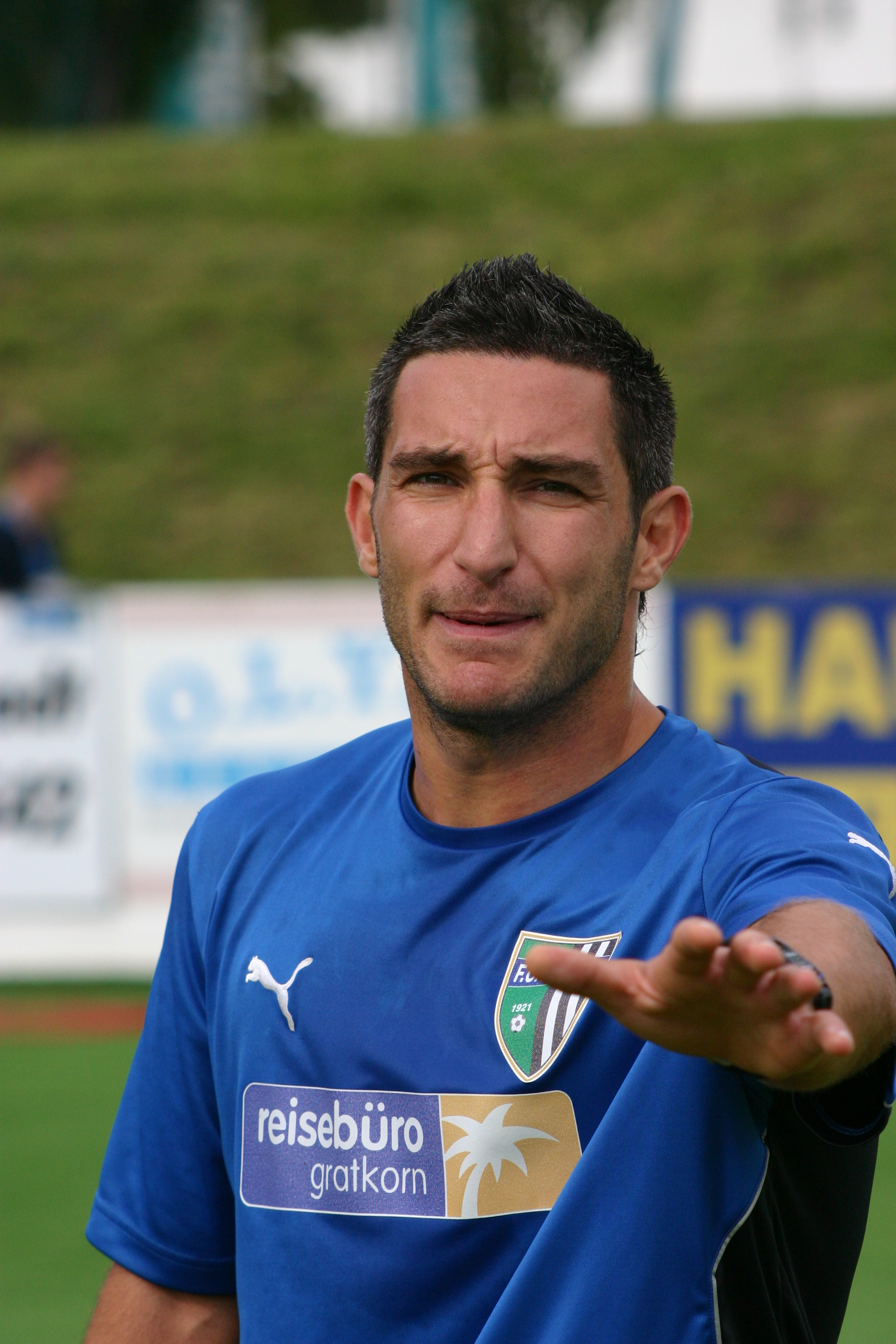

Personal information
- Date of birth: 17 June 1975 (age 50)
- Place of birth: Belgium
- Position: Striker

Senior career*
| Years | Team | Apps | (Gls) |
| –1998 | KSK Tongeren | | |
| 1999 | K. Beringen FC | | |
| 1999–2000 | KSK Tongeren | | |
| 2000–2001 | KFC Diest | | |
| 2001–2003 | KVK Tienen-Hageland | | |
| 2003–2010 | FC Gratkorn | 191 | (82) |
| 2011–2012 | SV Lebring | | |
- * Club domestic league appearances and goals

Georges Panagiotopoulos (born 17 June 1975) is a Belgian former football manager and former footballer.

== Playing career ==
Panagiotopoulos debuted in the Belgian second tier at the age of eighteen. He was described as a "boy to keep an eye on". In 1999, Panagiotopoulos signed for Belgian side K. Beringen FC. After that, he returned to Belgian side KSK Tongeren. In 2000, he signed for Belgian side KFC Diest. In 2001, he signed for Belgian side KVK Tienen-Hageland. In 2003, he signed for Austrian side FC Gratkorn. In 2011, he signed for Austrian side SV Lebring.

== Managerial career ==
Panagiotopoulos managed Austrian side FC Gratkron. He helped the club achieve sixth place. He has been described as a "firefighter" style manager.

== Personal life ==
Born in Belgium, Panagiotopoulos is of Greek descent. After retiring from professional football, Panagiotopoulos worked in the restaurant industry. He has a brother.
