= Yohan Zetuna =

Iraqi footballer

Personal information
- Full name: Yohan Salwan Zetuna
- Date of birth: 31 May 2000 (age 26)
- Place of birth: Tel Keppe, Nineveh, Iraq
- Height: 1.83 m (6 ft 0 in)
- Position: Defender

Youth career
- 2017–2020: Oaxaca

Senior career*
Years	Team	Apps	(Gls)
2020–2021	Oaxaca	3	(0)
2021	Atlante	0	(0)
2022	Municipal Grecia	1	(0)
2022	Oaxaca	0	(0)
2023	Al-Karkh		
2024–2025	Tlaxcala	7	(1)
2025	Al-Mosul		
2026	Oaxaca	2	(0)

International career
2021	Iraq U23	1	(0)
- * Club domestic league appearances and goals as of 4 September 2026

Yohan Salwan Zetuna (Arabic: يوهان زيتونة; born 31 May 2000) is an Iraqi professional footballer who currently plays for Liga de Expansión MX club Oaxaca.

== Early life ==
Born in Tel Keppe in the Nineveh Governorate of Iraq, Zetuna is one of four brothers, including fellow footballer Yousuf Zetuna, and has one sister. Due to the family being Catholic, they faced religious persecution in Iraq, and fled initially to Turkey, living in a United Nations refugee camp. After ten months in Turkey, the family moved to Michigan in the United States on 15 May 2009. In 2016, the family relocated to Oaxaca, Mexico, as one of Zetuna's uncles was living there.

== Club career ==
=== Alebrijes de Oaxaca ===
Having initially played football in the refugee camp in Turkey, and then in Sterling Heights, Michigan, Zetuna and his brother Yousuf joined the academy of professional side Alebrijes de Oaxaca in 2017, following their move to Mexico. Having signed professional contracts in February 2019, both were added to the senior squad ahead of the Clausura 2019.

He was given the chance to move to Spain, training with Águilas, but returned to Mexico shortly after, claiming that he did not enjoy the experience. His return to Mexico coincided with the COVID-19 pandemic, and the Mexican second division league, the Ascenso MX, was renamed as the Liga de Expansión MX, with Oaxaca officials unsure what would happen to foreign players under the new structure.

Zetuna would go on to make his debut the following year, playing seventy minutes in a 2–0 away win against Pumas Tabasco, before being replaced by César Aguirre. Following his next game, a 2–1 home loss to Atlante, Oaxaca accused Atlante player Rolando González of racially abusing Zetuna, condemning the act on the club's official Twitter account. Later in the season, he suffered an inflammation of the spleen, keeping him out of action after four appearances.

=== Later career ===
Having briefly played for Atlante without making a professional appearance, Zetuna was announced as a new player for Costa Rican side Municipal Grecia at the end of 2021. After half a year with the side, in which he made one appearance, he was announced as one of four players to depart the club in May 2022.

== International career ==
Zetuna was called up to training camps with the Iraq under-17 side in 2017. In late August 2021, he was called up to the Iraq under-23 side for a friendly tournament in Saudi Arabia. He featured in one game for the side, but was sent off in the first half as Iraq lost 4–1 to the United Arab Emirates.

== Career statistics ==
=== Club ===
As of 4 September 2026.

Appearances and goals by club, season and competition
Club	Season	League			Cup		Other		Total	
Club	Season	Division	Apps	Goals	Apps	Goals	Apps	Goals	Apps	Goals
Oaxaca	2020–21	Liga de Expansión MX	3	0	0	0	0	0	3	0
Atlante	2021–22	Liga de Expansión MX	0	0	0	0	0	0	0	0
Municipal Grecia	2021–22	Liga FPD	1	0	0	0	0	0	1	0
Oaxaca	2022–23	Liga de Expansión MX	0	0	0	0	0	0	0	0
Tlaxcala	2023–24	Liga de Expansión MX	5	1	0	0	0	0	5	1
Tlaxcala	2024–25	Liga de Expansión MX	2	0	0	0	0	0	2	0
Tlaxcala	Total		7	1	0	0	0	0	7	1
Oaxaca	2025–26	Liga de Expansión MX	2	0	0	0	0	0	2	0
Career total			13	1	0	0	0	0	13	1
