= Modou Jagne =

Gambian footballer

Personal information
- Date of birth: 14 February 1983 (age 43)
- Place of birth: Banjul, Gambia
- Height: 1.88 m (6 ft 2 in)
- Position: Striker

Senior career*
| Years | Team | Apps | (Gls) |
| 2003–2006 | Banjul Hawks FC | | |
| 2006–2008 | SCR Altach | 67 | (9) |
| 2009–2010 | SK Austria Kärnten | 14 | (1) |

International career
| 2006– | Gambia | 5 | (0) |
- * Club domestic league appearances and goals as of 30 June 2010

Modou Jagne (born 14 February 1983) is a footballer from Gambia. He plays for the Gambia senior squad. He was signed to SC Rheindorf Altach in Austria until his release in January 2009. Jagne then signed with SK Austria Kärnten until the club went bankrupt in June 2010.
