= Gratkorn =

- Municipality
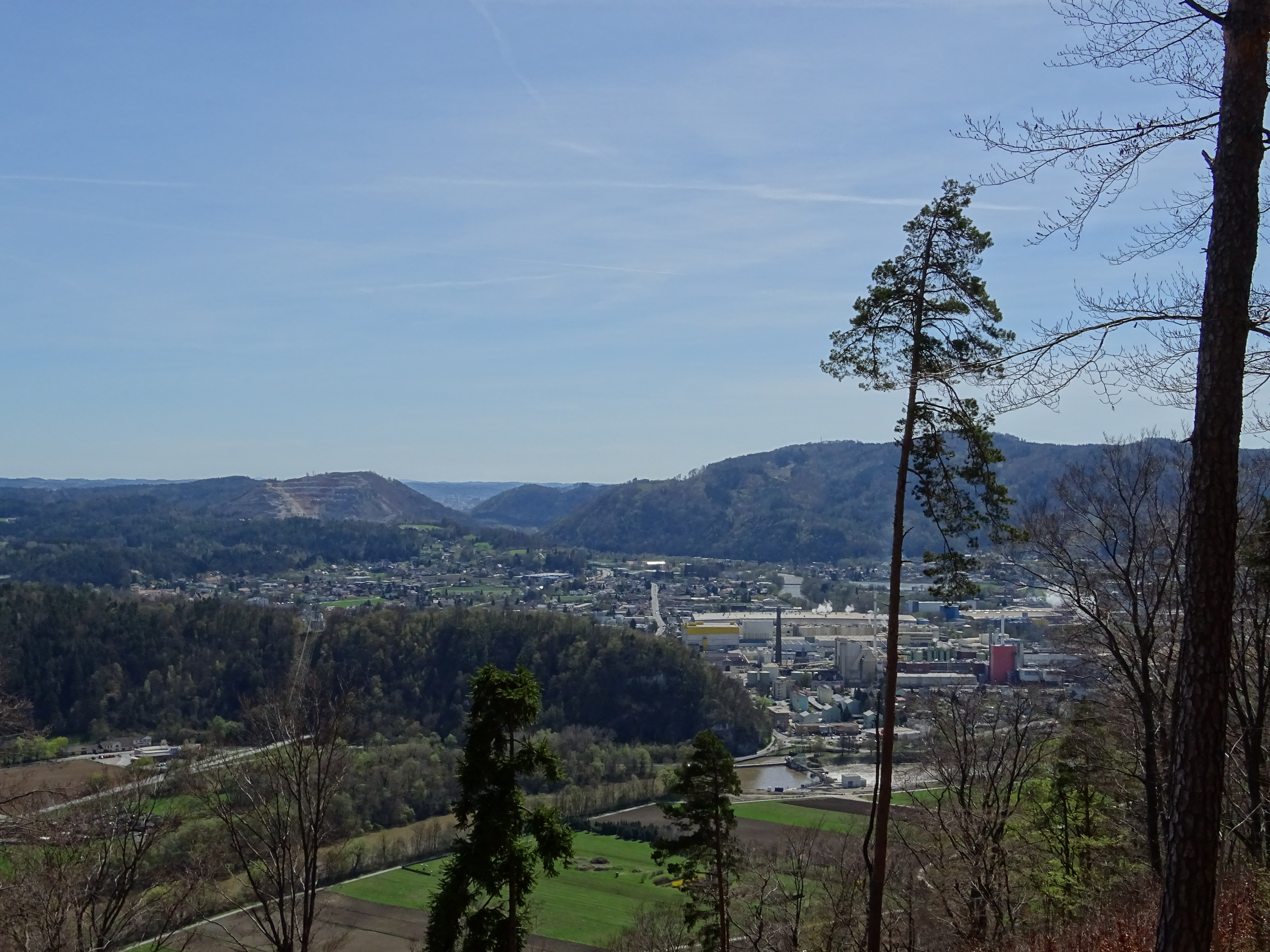
- Gratkorn

- Coat of arms

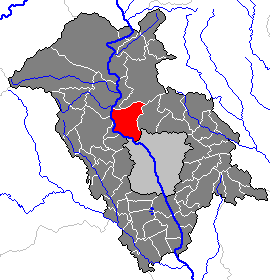
- Location within Graz-Umgebung district

- Location within Austria
- Coordinates: 47°08′08″N 15°20′21″E
- Country: Austria
- State: Styria
- District: Graz-Umgebung

Government
  - Mayor: Ernest Kupfer (SPÖ)

Area
  - Total: 34.56 km^{2} (13.34 sq mi)
- Elevation: 380 m (1,250 ft)

Population (2018-01-01)
  - Total: 7,892
  - Density: 228.4/km^{2} (591.4/sq mi)
- Time zone: UTC+1 (CET)
  - Summer (DST): UTC+2 (CEST)
- Postal code: 8101
- Area code: 03124, 03127
- Vehicle registration: GU
- Website: www.gratkorn.com

Gratkorn (German: [ɡʁatˈkɔʁn]) is a municipality in the district of Graz-Umgebung in the Austrian state of Styria. It is an industrial suburb of Graz.

== Population ==
Historical population
Year	Pop.	±%
1869	1,639	—
1880	2,271	+38.6%
1890	3,436	+51.3%
1900	4,055	+18.0%
1910	4,373	+7.8%
1923	4,437	+1.5%
1934	4,501	+1.4%
1939	4,539	+0.8%
1951	4,970	+9.5%
1961	5,287	+6.4%
1971	6,054	+14.5%
1981	6,112	+1.0%
1991	6,113	+0.0%
2001	6,625	+8.4%
2011	7,519	+13.5%

== Notable sites ==
Gratkorn is known for Austrian Open Air Museum Stübing, Rein_Abbey,_Austria, and Kirche St. Stefan.
