= Thomas Wagner (footballer) =

Austrian footballer (1976–2023)

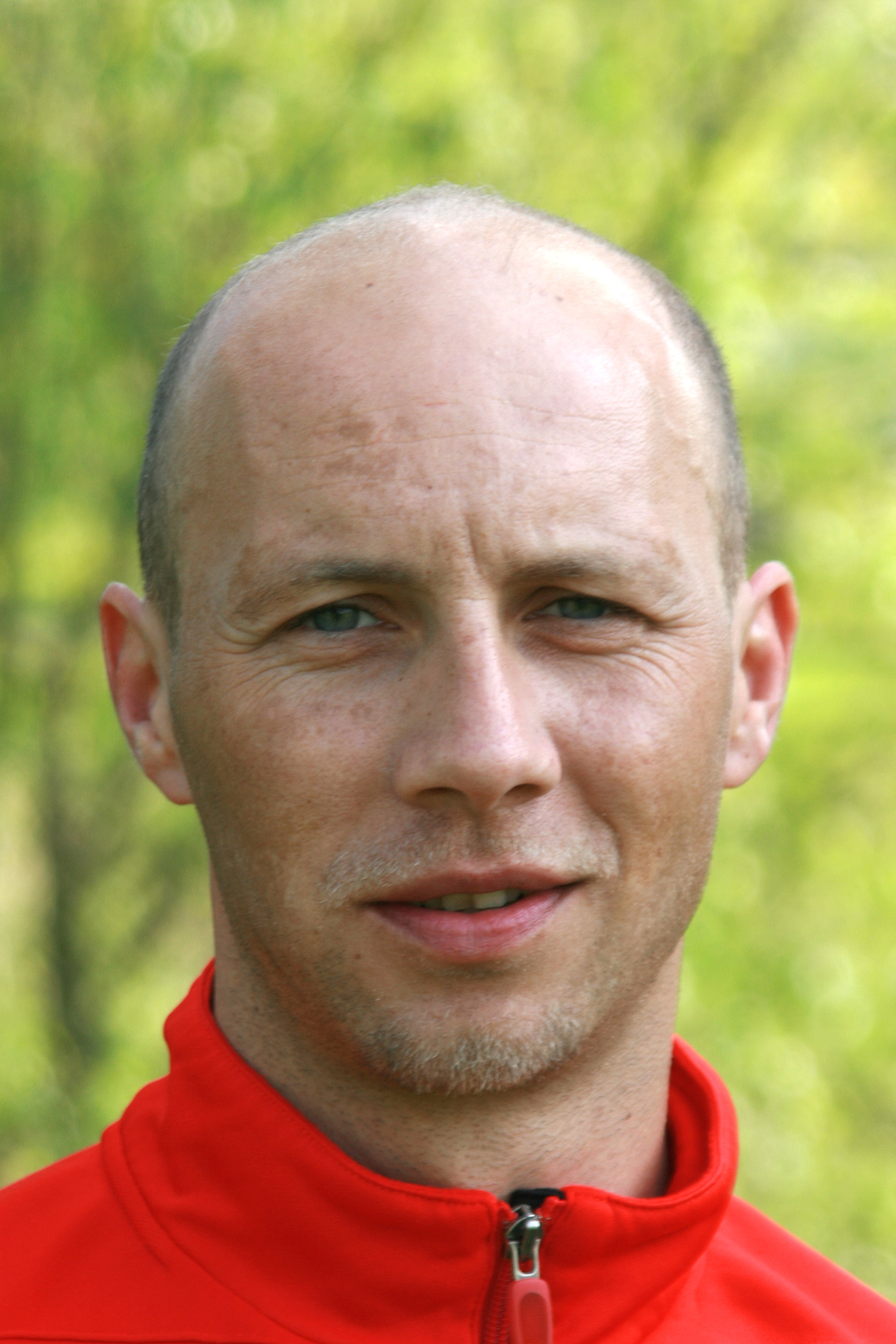

Personal information
- Date of birth: 9 October 1976
- Place of birth: Fürstenfeld, Austria
- Date of death: 15 March 2023 (aged 46)
- Height: 1.81 m (5 ft 11 in)
- Position: Forward

Youth career
- SV Rohrbrunn

Senior career*
Years	Team	Apps	(Gls)
1994	SV Rohrbrunn		
1995	TSV Hartberg		
1995–1996	SV Rohrbrunn		
1996–1997	SV Stegersbach		
1997–1998	SV Rohrbrunn		
1998–2000	SV Neuberg		
2000–2010	Mattersburg	277	(71)
2010	SV Stegersbach		
- * Club domestic league appearances and goals

Thomas Wagner (9 October 1976 – 15 March 2023) was an Austrian professional footballer who played as a forward, spending the majority of his career with SV Mattersburg.

== Death ==
Wagner died on 15 March 2023, at the age of 46.
