= Weikendorf =

- Municipality
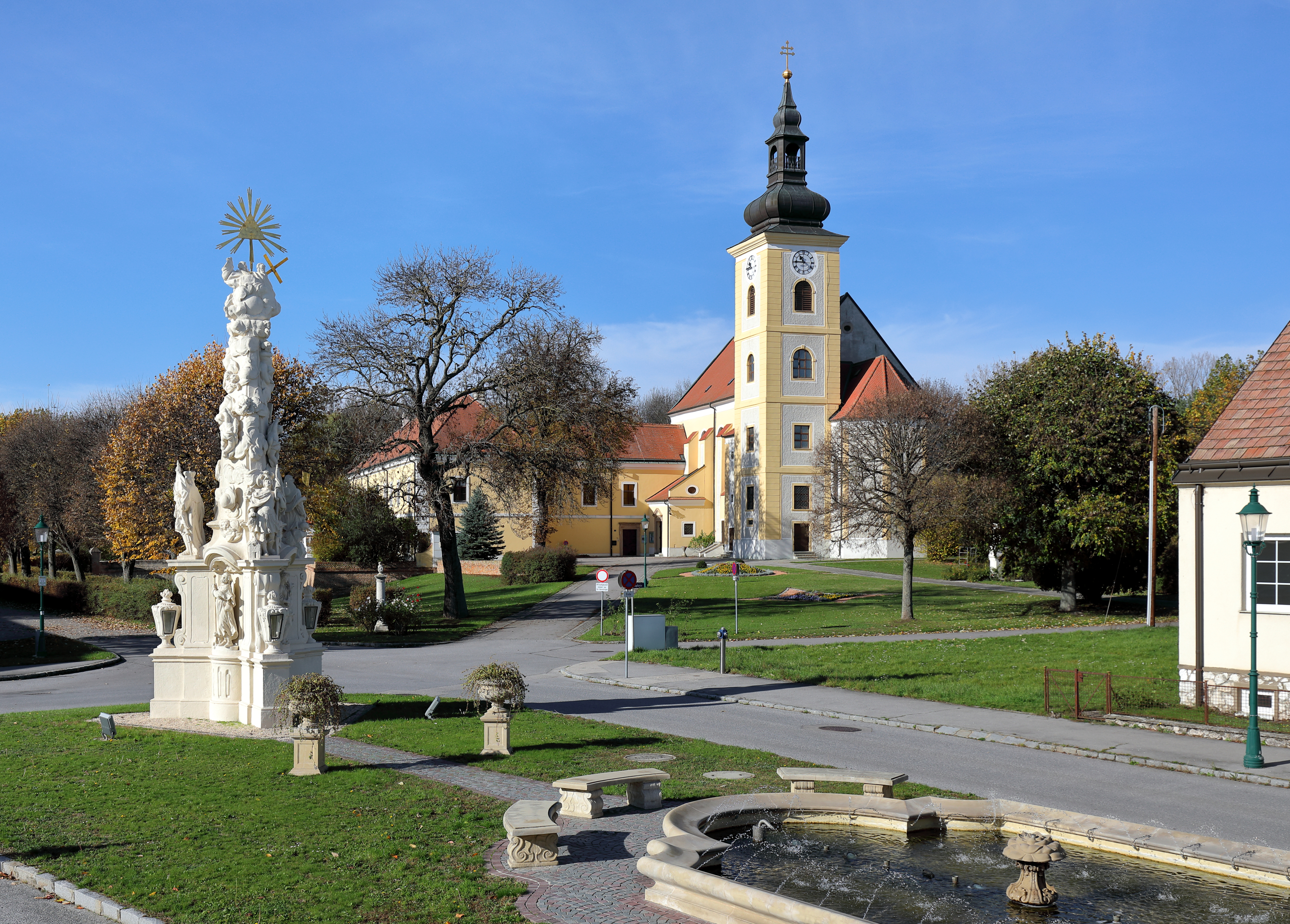
- Historic center of Weikendorf

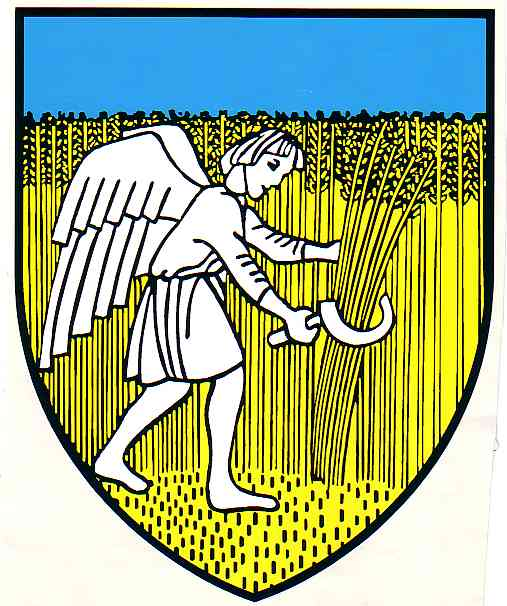
- Coat of arms

- Location within Austria
- Coordinates: 48°21′N 16°46′E
- Country: Austria
- State: Lower Austria
- District: Gänserndorf

Government
  - Mayor: Johann Zimmermann

Area
  - Total: 46.31 km^{2} (17.88 sq mi)
- Elevation: 152 m (499 ft)

Population (2018-01-01)
  - Total: 2,029
  - Density: 43.81/km^{2} (113.5/sq mi)
- Time zone: UTC+1 (CET)
  - Summer (DST): UTC+2 (CEST)
- Postal code: 2253
- Area code: 02282
- Website: www.gdeweikendorf.at

Weikendorf is a town in the district of Gänserndorf in the State of Lower Austria, in northeast Austria.

== Population ==
Historical population
Year	Pop.	±%
1869	1,235	—
1939	1,971	+59.6%
1971	1,483	−24.8%
1981	1,609	+8.5%
1991	1,883	+17.0%
2001	1,976	+4.9%
2011	1,917	−3.0%
