= Michael Mörz =

Austrian footballer

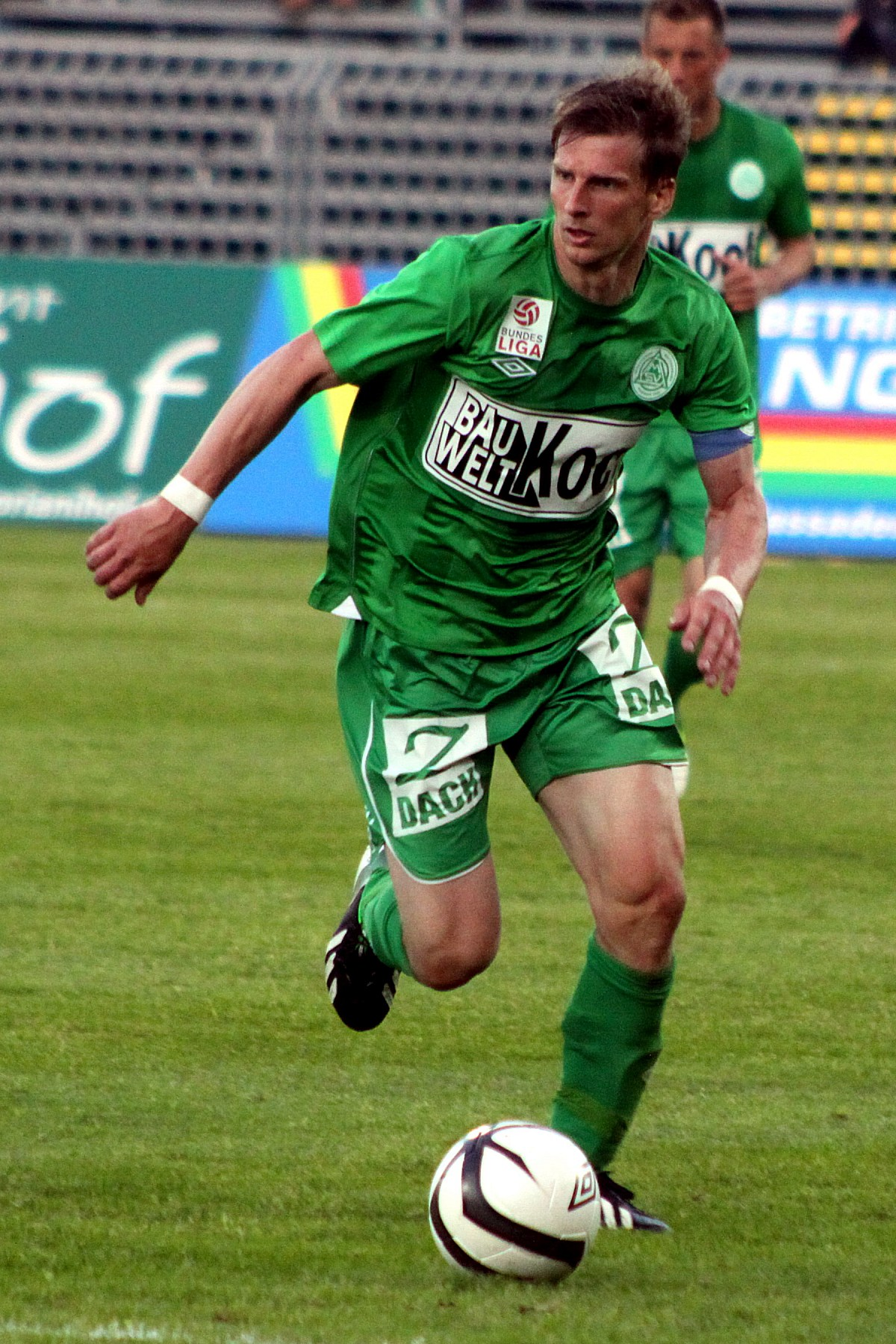

Personal information
- Date of birth: 2 April 1980 (age 46)
- Place of birth: Eisenstadt, Austria
- Height: 1.75 m (5 ft 9 in)
- Position: Midfielder

Youth career
- 1996–2000: SV Mattersburg

Senior career*
Years	Team	Apps	(Gls)
2000–2015	SV Mattersburg	322	(68)
2015	SV Schattendorf		

International career^{‡}
2005–2014	Austria	12	(0)
- * Club domestic league appearances and goals as of 23 March 2016 ‡ National team caps and goals as of 11 August 2008

Michael Mörz (born 2 April 1980) is an Austrian professional footballer who currently plays for SV Schattendorf as a midfielder.

== International career ==
He made his debut for Austria in a September 2005 World Cup qualification match against Azerbaijan but was not considered for the EURO 2008 squad. Until August 2008, he earned 12 caps, no goals scored.
