= FC Gratkorn =

- Full name: Fußball Club Gratkorn
- Founded: 1921; 104 years ago
- Ground: Sportstadion Gratkorn
- Capacity: 3,000
- Head coach: Alexander Pettinger
- League: Unterliga Central
- 2023–24: Oberliga Central West, 14th of 14 (relegated)
- Website: https://fcgratkorn.at/
Home colours	Away colours

FC Gratkorn is an Austrian association football club from Gratkorn that competes in the Unterliga Central, the seventh tier of Austrian football.

== History ==
The club was founded in 1921 as SV Gratkorn. In 1996, they changed their name to FC Gratkorn.

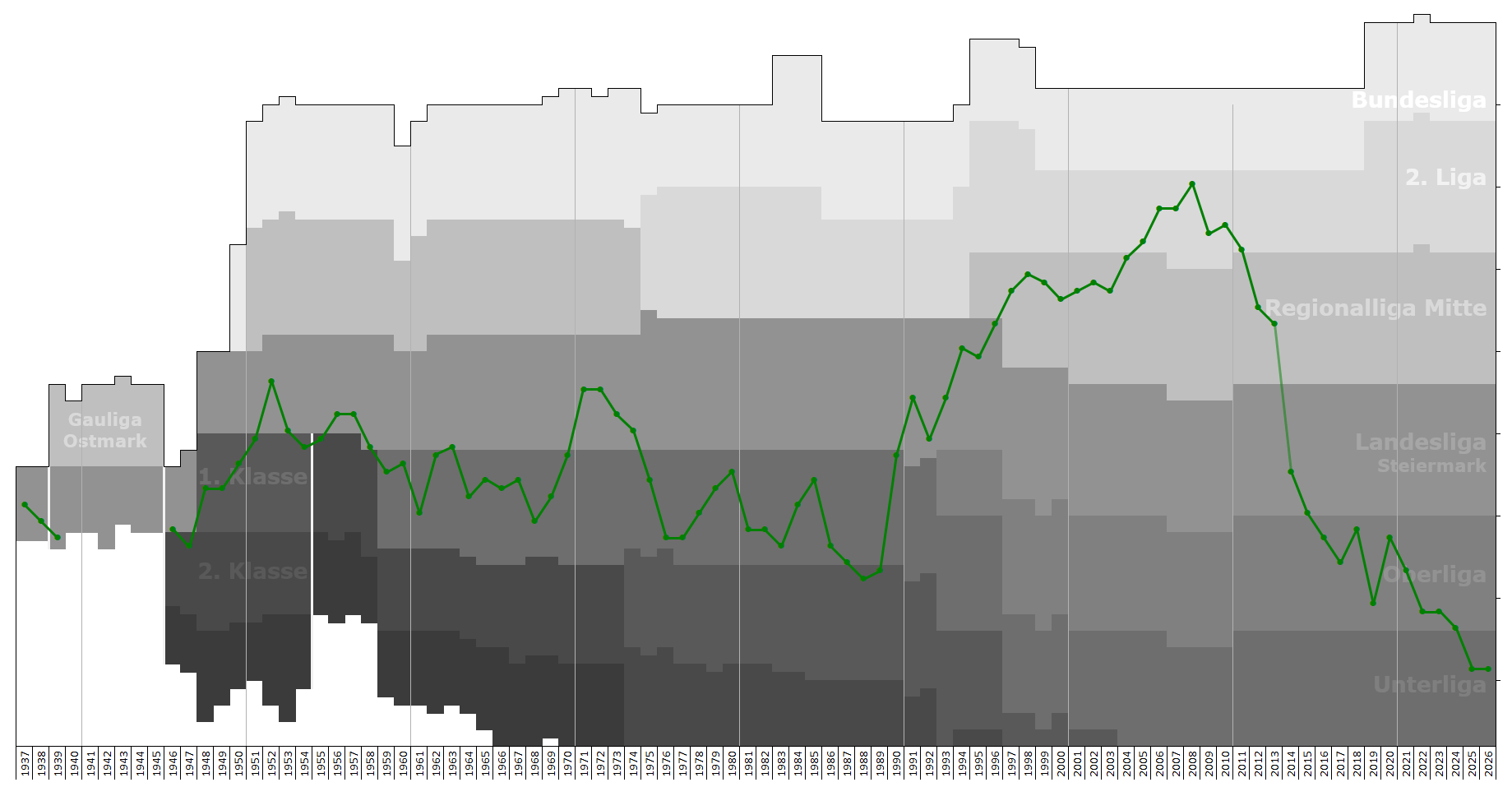
Historical chart of the club's league performance
