= SC Austria Lustenau =

Austrian football club, based in Lustenau

Austria Lustenau
- Full name: Sportclub Austria Lustenau
- Founded: June 1914; 112 years ago
- Ground: Planet Pure Stadion; Lustenau, Austria
- Capacity: 5,138
- Owner: Ahmet Schaefer
- Chairman: Bernd Bösch
- Manager: Markus Mader
- League: Austrian Bundesliga
- 2025–26: 2. Liga, 1st of 16 (champion)
Home colours	Away colours

Sportclub Austria Lustenau is a professional football club based in the town of Lustenau, Vorarlberg, Austria, that competes in the Austrian Bundesliga, the first tier of the Austrian football league system. Founded in 1914, it is affiliated to the Vorarlberg Football Association. The team plays its home matches at Reichshofstadion, where it has been based since 1951. The club's history includes several cup finals, numerous promotions and relegations, and some spells of sustained success.

The club won the 2021–22 Austrian Football Second League and returned to the Austrian Football Bundesliga for the 2022–23 season for the first time in 22 years.

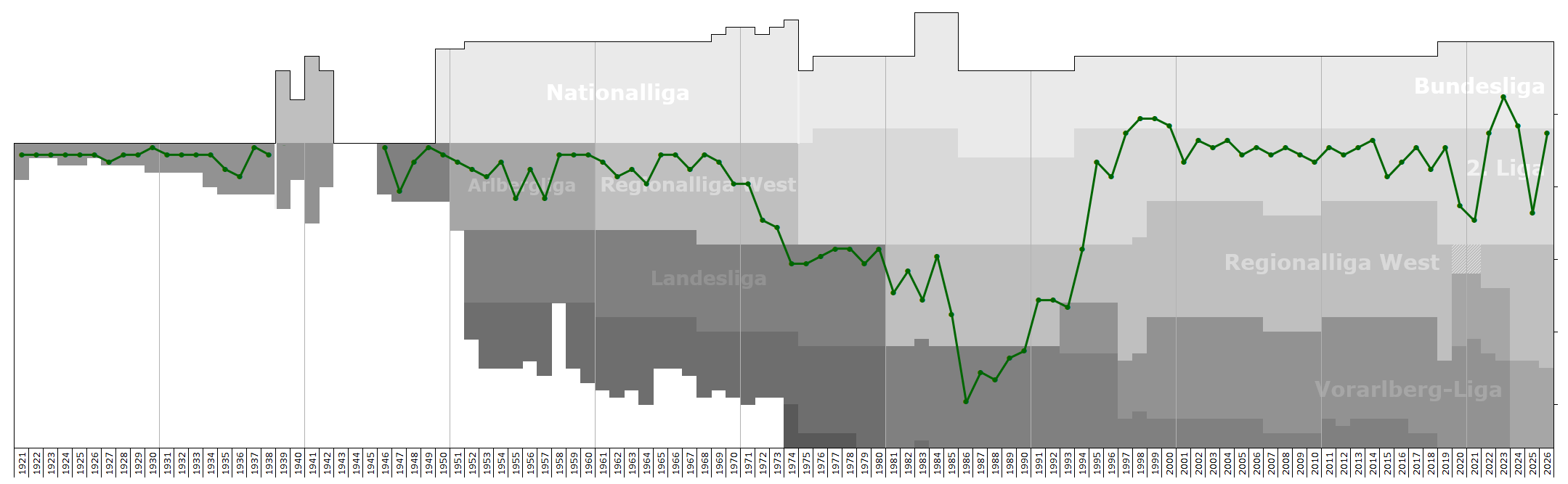
Historical chart of Austria Lustenau league performance

== Current squad ==
As of 8 September 2026

Note: Flags indicate national team as defined under FIFA eligibility rules; some limited exceptions apply. Players may hold more than one non-FIFA nationality.

No.	Pos.	Nation	Player
3	DF	BRA	Danilo Soares
7	DF	AUT	Fabian Gmeiner
8	MF	KOS	Dion Kacuri (on loan from Basel)
9	FW	GER	Lenn Jastremski
10	FW	GAM	Alieu Conateh (on loan from Grasshopper)
11	FW	AUT	Dominik Weixelbraun (on loan from Rapid Wien)
12	DF	AUT	Novak Rajic
14	FW	NGR	Precious Benjamin (on loan from TSG Hoffenheim)
15	DF	NGR	Emmanuel Chukwu (on loan from TSG Hoffenheim)
17	FW	AUT	Albin Gashi
18	DF	FRA	Robin Voisine
19	MF	FRA	Sacha Delaye

No.	Pos.	Nation	Player
20	MF	GHA	Lord Afrifa
21	DF	BRA	Anílson
23	MF	AUT	Pius Grabher
24	FW	MLI	Seydou Diarra
26	DF	AUT	Lukas Ibertsberger
27	GK	AUT	Domenik Schierl
29	DF	AUT	Niklas Pertlwieser
30	GK	GER	Phillip Böhm
31	DF	AUT	Matthias Maak
33	GK	AUT	Frederic Flatz
39	FW	CRO	Antonio Verinac (on loan from St. Gallen)
54	FW	AUT	Melih Akbulut
61	MF	AUT	Haris Ismailcebioglu

=== Out on loan ===
Note: Flags indicate national team as defined under FIFA eligibility rules; some limited exceptions apply. Players may hold more than one non-FIFA nationality.

No.	Pos.	Nation	Player
—	GK	AUT	Simon Nesler-Täubl (at Austria Salzburg until 30 June 2027)

== Former players ==
- (Iraq) Murad Gerdi

== Manager history ==
As of 22 May 2019

From 1992 onwards

- (Germany) Peter Assion (1992–1994)
- (Germany) Edi Stöhr (1994–1999)
- (Germany) Klaus Scheer (1999)
- (Serbia) Goran Stanisavljević (2000)
- (Austria) Wolfgang Schwarz (2000–2001)
- (Germany) Edi Stöhr (2001–2003)
- (Austria) Andreas Heraf (2003–2005)
- (Austria) Heinz Fuchsbichler (2005–2007)
- (Austria) Hans Kleer (2007–2009)
- (Germany) Edi Stöhr (2009–2011)
- (Iceland) Helgi Kolviðsson (2011–2014)
- (Croatia) Mladen Posavec (2014–2015)
- (Tunisia) Lassaad Chabbi (2015–2017)
- (Germany) Daniel Ernemann (2017)
- (Austria) Andreas Lipa (2017)
- (Germany) Daniel Ernemann (2017)
- (Austria) Gernot Plassnegger (2017–2019)
- (Austria) Roman Mählich (2019–2020)
- (Germany) Alexander Kiene (2020–2021)
- (Austria) Markus Mader (2021–2023)
- (Austria) Alexander Schneider (2023–)

== Honours ==
- Austrian Cup
  - Runners-up (2): 2010–11, 2019–20
- Austrian Football Second League
  - Champions (3): 1996–97, 2021–22, 2025-26

== See also ==
- List of football (soccer) clubs
- List of football clubs in Austria
- Christoph Stuckler
