= 2004–05 FK Austria Wien season =

Austria Wien
2004–05 season
- Manager: Lars Søndergaard
- Stadium: Franz Horr Stadium
- Bundesliga: 3rd
- ÖFB-Cup: Winners
- Austrian Supercup: Winners
- UEFA Cup: Quarter-finals
- Top goalscorer: League: Sigurd Rushfeldt (19 goals); All: Sigurd Rushfeldt (22 goals)

The 2004–05 Austria Wien season was the 31st consecutive season of Austria Wien in the Austrian Football Bundesliga, with the club ending in third place with 69 points. They started the season by beating Bundesliga champion Grazer AK in the Austrian Supercup on penalties, and beat rivals Rapid Wien in the final of the Austrian Cup.

The club also had a brilliant European campaign in the UEFA Cup, reaching the quarter-finals by defeating Spanish clubs Athletic Bilbao and Real Zaragoza. In the quarter-finals, they faced Italian club Parma, tying with the club in both legs, but eventually failed to reach the semi-finals of the competition due to the away goal rule.

== First-team squad ==
Squad at end of season

Note: Flags indicate national team as defined under FIFA eligibility rules; some limited exceptions apply. Players may hold more than one non-FIFA nationality.

| No. | Pos. | Nation | Player |
|---|---|---|---|
| 1 | GK | CRO | Joey Didulica (Note: Didulica was born in Geelong, Australia, and represented them at U-23 level, but also qualified to represent Croatia internationally through his parents and made his international debut for Croatia in April 2004.) |
| 2 | DF | NGA | Rabiu Afolabi |
| 3 | DF | ARG | Fernando Ariel Troyansky |
| 4 | DF | SWE | Mikael Antonsson |
| 5 | DF | BIH | Saša Papac |
| 6 | DF | AUT | Ernst Dospel |
| 7 | MF | CZE | Libor Sionko |
| 8 | MF | AUT | Michael Wagner |
| 9 | FW | AUT | Ivica Vastić (Note: Vastić was born in Split, Yugoslavia (now Croatia), but also qualified to represent Austria internationally after obtaining citizenship and made his international debut for Austria in 1996.) |
| 10 | MF | SVK | Vladimír Janočko |
| 11 | MF | CZE | Štěpán Vachoušek |
| 12 | GK | HUN | Szabolcs Sáfár |
| 15 | MF | FRA | Jocelyn Blanchard |
| 16 | DF | POL | Krzysztof Ratajczyk |
| 17 | DF | BEL | Didier Dheedene |
| 18 | DF | AUT | Florian Metz |

| No. | Pos. | Nation | Player |
|---|---|---|---|
| 19 | MF | POL | Radosław Gilewicz |
| 20 | MF | AUT | Markus Kiesenebner |
| 21 | FW | NOR | Sigurd Rushfeldt |
| 22 | FW | NGA | Tosin Dosunmu |
| 23 | MF | AUT | Richard Kitzbichler |
| 24 | MF | AUT | Christoph Saurer |
| 26 | MF | AUT | Pascal Velek |
| 27 | DF | AUT | Andreas Schicker |
| 28 | DF | AUT | Daniel Sobkova |
| 29 | MF | AUT | Alexander Schörg |
| 30 | FW | AUT | Halil Akaslan |
| 31 | GK | AUT | Robert Almer |
| 32 | GK | GER | Marc Ziegler |
| 33 | MF | POL | Sebastian Mila |
| 34 | DF | CZE | Adam Petrouš (on loan from Rubin Kazan) |

=== Left club during season ===
Note: Flags indicate national team as defined under FIFA eligibility rules; some limited exceptions apply. Players may hold more than one non-FIFA nationality.

| No. / Pos. / Nation / Player; 13 / GK / AUT / Bartoloměj Kuru (Note: Kuru was born in Nymburk, Czechoslovakia (now the Czech Republic), but also qualifies to represent Austria internationally after obtaining citizenship and has represented them at every youth level from U-17 to U-21.) (on loan to LASK Linz) | No. / Pos. / Nation / Player; 25 / DF / BRA / Fernando Santos (released) |

== Competitions ==
Win Draw Loss Postponed

=== Overall record ===
| Competition | First match | Last match | Starting round | Final position | Record | | | | | | | |
| Competition | First match | Last match | Starting round | Final position | Pld | W | D | L | GF | GA | GD | Win % |
|---|---|---|---|---|---|---|---|---|---|---|---|---|
| Bundesliga | 13 July 2004 | 29 May 2005 | Matchday 1 | Third place | 36 | 19 | 12 | 5 | 64 | 24 | +40 | 52.78 |
| Austrian Cup | 20 April 2005 | 1 June 2005 | Round of 16 | Winners | 4 | 4 | 0 | 0 | 12 | 1 | +11 | 100.00 |
| UEFA Cup | 30 July 2004 | 14 April 2005 | Second qualifying round | Quarter-finals | 14 | 6 | 7 | 1 | 17 | 9 | +8 | 42.86 |
| Austrian Supercup | 9 July 2004 | 9 July 2004 | Final | Winners | 1 | 1 | 0 | 0 | 1 | 1 | +0 | 100.00 |
| Total | | | | | 55 | 30 | 19 | 6 | 94 | 35 | +59 | 54.55 |

Source: Competitions

=== Austrian Supercup ===
| 9 July 2004 Final | Grazer AK | 1-1 (a.e.t.) (2-4 p) | Austria Wien | Arnold Schwarzenegger-Stadion, Graz |
| 20:30 | Kollmann 8' | Report | Pogatetz 54' (o.g.) | Attendance: 7,128; Referee: Thomas Steiner |
| | Penalties |
| | Kollmann (penalty scored); Standfest (penalty scored); Tokić (penalty missed); Aufhauser (penalty missed) | | Vastić (penalty scored); Wagner (penalty scored); Kiesenebner (penalty scored); Rushfeldt (penalty scored) |

=== Bundesliga ===
==== League table ====
| Pos | Team | Pld | W | D | L | GF | GA | GD | Pts | Qualification or relegation |
|---|---|---|---|---|---|---|---|---|---|---|
| 1 | Rapid Wien (C) | 36 | 21 | 8 | 7 | 67 | 31 | +36 | 71 | Qualification to Champions League second qualifying round |
| 2 | Grazer AK | 36 | 21 | 7 | 8 | 58 | 28 | +30 | 70 | Qualification to UEFA Cup second qualifying round |
| 3 | Austria Wien | 36 | 19 | 12 | 5 | 64 | 24 | +40 | 69 | Qualification to UEFA Cup second qualifying round |
| 4 | Pasching | 36 | 17 | 9 | 10 | 53 | 48 | +5 | 60 | Qualification to UEFA Cup second qualifying round |
| 5 | Mattersburg | 36 | 12 | 9 | 15 | 48 | 58 | −10 | 45 | |

Source: weltfussball.de (in German)
Rules for classification: 1) points; 2) goal difference; 3) number of goals scored.
(C) Champions

===== Matches =====
| 14 July 2004 1 | Austria Wien | 2-1 | Admira Wacker Mödling | Franz Horr Stadium, Vienna |
| 19:30 | Janočko 58'; Rushfeldt 70' | Report | Kovačević 16' | Attendance: 5,595; Referee: Manfred Krassnitzer |

| 21 July 2004 2 | Mattersburg | 0-0 | Austria Wien | Pappelstadion, Mattersburg |
| 19:30 | | Report | | Attendance: 13,628; Referee: Bernhard Brugger |

| 1 August 2004 3 | Austria Wien | 1-1 | Rapid Wien | Franz Horr Stadium, Vienna |
| 19:30 | Rushfeldt 16' | Report | Kincl 12' | Attendance: 10,606; Referee: Stefan Meßner |

| 7 August 2004 4 | Superfund | 2-1 | Austria Wien | Waldstadion, Pasching |
| 19:30 | Kirchler 36'; Chaile 76' | Report | Rushfeldt 83' (pen.) | Attendance: 4,461; Referee: Konrad Plautz |

| 15 August 2004 5 | Austria Wien | 2-2 | Wacker Tirol | Franz Horr Stadium, Vienna |
| 19:30 | Kiesenebner 12'; Vastić 37' | Report | Mair 22'; Grüner 23' | Attendance: 5,269; Referee: Gerald Lehner |

| 22 August 2004 6 | Bregenz | 0-9 | Austria Wien | Casino Stadium, Bregenz |
| 19:15 | | Report | Vachoušek 1'; Rushfeldt 9', 54', 75', 85'; Vastić 45'; Papac 50'; Gilewicz 58', 62' | Attendance: 3,900; Referee: Franz Mostböck |

| 29 August 2004 7 | Austria Wien | 2-0 | Austria Salzburg | Franz Horr Stadium, Vienna |
| 19:30 | Papac 90+4'; Rushfeldt 90+5' | Report | | Attendance: 7,411; Referee: Thomas Einwaller |

| 12 September 2004 8 | Grazer AK | 0-1 | Austria Wien | Arnold Schwarzeneger-Stadion, Graz |
| 15:30 | | Report | Rushfeldt 75' | Attendance: 10,121; Referee: Dietmar Drabek |

| 19 September 2004 9 | Sturm Graz | 0-2 | Austria Wien | Arnold Schwarzeneger-Stadion, Graz |
| 15:30 | | Report | Vastić 40', 47' | Attendance: 5,807; Referee: Gerald Lehner |

| 26 September 2004 10 | Austria Wien | 3-0 | Sturm Graz | Franz Horr Stadium, Vienna |
| 15:30 | Vastić 8'; Rushfeldt 24', 49' | Report | | Attendance: 6,935; Referee: Franz Mostböck |

| 3 October 2004 11 | Admira Wacker Mödling | 0-5 | Austria Wien | Bundesstadion Südstadt, Maria Enzersdorf |
| 15:30 | | Report | Blanchard 14'; Rushfeldt 49'; Kiesenebner 59'; Kitzbichler 75'; Janočko 90' (pen.) | Attendance: 3,809; Referee: Thomas Einwaller |

| 16 October 2004 12 | Austria Wien | 2-0 | Mattersburg | Franz Horr Stadium, Vienna |
| 18:00 | Rushfeldt 19'; Vastić 28' | Report | | Attendance: 4,610; Referee: Gerald Lehner |

| 24 October 2004 13 | SK Rapid Wien | 1-1 | Austria Wien | Gerhard-Hanappi-Stadion, Vienna |
| 15:30 | Katzer 54' | Report | Vastić 46' | Attendance: 17,326; Referee: Wolfgang Sowa |

| 27 October 2004 14 | Austria Wien | 1-2 | Superfund | Franz Horr Stadium, Vienna |
| 19:30 | Dospel 36' | Report | Pichlmann 53'; Mayrleb 57' | Attendance: 4,911; Referee: Louis Hofmann |

| 30 October 2004 15 | Wacker Tirol | 0-2 | Austria Wien | Tivol Stadion, Innsbruck |
| 18:00 | | Report | Sionko 71'; Rushfeldt 81' | Attendance: 6,776; Referee: Martin Salm |

| 7 November 2004 16 | Austria Wien | 2-0 | Bregenz | Franz Horr Stadium, Vienna |
| 15:30 | Gilewicz 77'; Kiesenebner 88' | Report | | Attendance: 4,546; Referee: Manfred Krassnitzer |

| 13 November 2004 17 | Austria Salzburg | 1-1 | Austria Wien | Wals-Siezenheim Stadium, Salzburg |
| 18:00 | Laessig 52' | Report | Dheedene 87' | Attendance: 6,965; Referee: Stefan Meßner |

| 20 November 2004 18 | Austria Wien | 0-0 | Grazer AK | Franz Horr Stadium, Vienna |
| 18:00 | | Report | | Attendance: 5,204; Referee: Konrad Plautz |

| 28 November 2004 19 | Bregenz | 0-1 | Austria Wien | Casino Stadium, Bregenz |
| 15:30 | | Report | Dosunmu 66' | Attendance: 3,500; Referee: Louis Hofmann |

| 4 December 2004 20 | Austria Wien | 3-1 | Austria Salzburg | Franz Horr Stadium, Vienna |
| 18:00 | Vachoušek 7' (pen.), 66'; Gilewicz 40' | Report | Keil 10' | Attendance: 4,877; Referee: Wolfgang Falb |

| 7 December 2004 21 | Mattersburg | 2-1 | Austria Wien | Pappelstadion, Mattersburg |
| 18:45 | Kühbauer 39' (pen.); Mörz 69' | Report | Dospel 54' | Attendance: 11,823; Referee: Gerald Lehner |

| 5 March 2005 24 | Sturm Graz | 1-0 | Austria Wien | Arnold Schwarzenegger-Stadion, Graz |
| 18:30 | Filipović 36' | Report | | Attendance: 4,122; Referee: Konrad Plautz |

| 13 March 2005 25 | Austria Wien | 1-0 | Rapid Wien | Franz Horr Stadium, Vienna |
| 15:30 | Rushfeldt 8' | Report | | Attendance: 9,980; Referee: Thomas Steiner |

| 20 March 2005 26 | Admira Wacker Mödling | 2-2 | Austria Wien | Bundesstadion Südstadt, Maria Enzersdorf |
| 15:30 | Oravec 75'; Wolf 83' | Report | Vachoušek 37'; Rushfeldt 64' | Attendance: 3,207; Referee: Stefan Meßner |

| 2 April 2005 27 | Austria Wien | 1-0 | Wacker Tirol | Franz Horr Stadium, Vienna |
| 18:30 | Rushfeldt 57' | Report | | Attendance: 6,544; Referee: Bernhard Brugger |

| 10 April 2005 28 | Wacker Tirol | 0-3 | Austria Wien | Tivoli-Stadion, Innsbruck |
| 15:30 | | Report | Vastić 13'; Afolabi 54'; Kiesenebner 69' | Attendance: 6,838; Referee: Gerald Lehner |

| 17 April 2005 29 | Austria Wien | 1-1 | Bregenz | Franz Horr Stadium, Vienna |
| 15:30 | Sionko 65' | Report | Jansen 3' | Attendance: 6,088; Referee: Louis Hofmann |

| 23 April 2005 30 | Austria Salzburg | 0-1 | Austria Wien | Wals-Siezenheim Stadium, Salzburg |
| 18:30 | | Report | Vastić 5' | Attendance: 7,386; Referee: René Rogalla |

| 30 April 2005 31 | Austria Wien | 0-0 | Mattersburg | Franz Horr Stadium, Vienna |
| 18:30 | | Report | | Attendance: 6,950; Referee: Thomas Steiner |

| 5 May 2005 22 | Austria Wien | 0-3 | Grazer AK | Franz Horr Stadium, Vienna |
| 15:30 | | Report | Kollmann 40', 78'; Didulica 62' (o.g.) | Attendance: 7,440; Referee: Dietmar Drabek |

| 8 May 2005 32 | Grazer AK | 0-0 | Austria Wien | Arnold Schwarzenegger-Stadion, Graz |
| 15:30 | | Report | | Attendance: 11,260; Referee: Konrad Plautz |

| 11 May 2005 23 | Austria Wien | 4-0 | Superfund | Franz Horr Stadium, Vienna |
| 19:30 | Dosunmu 15', 41'; Vastić 89' (pen.); Kiesenebner 90+2' | Report | | Attendance: 100; Referee: Bernhard Brugger |

| 15 May 2005 33 | Superfund | 1-1 | Austria Wien | Waldstadion, Pasching |
| 15:30 | Glieder 65' | Report | Petrouš 48' | Attendance: 5,517; Referee: Stefan Meßner |

| 21 May 2005 34 | Austria Wien | 2-2 | Sturm Graz | Franz Horr Stadium, Vienna |
| 18:30 | Rushfeldt 44'; Gilewicz 47' | Report | Dağ 41'; Rabilhou 80' | Attendance: 6,117; Referee: Gerald Lehner |

| 26 May 2005 35 | Rapid Wien | 0-1 | Austria Wien | Ernst-Happel-Stadion, Vienna |
| 18:30 | | Report | Rushfeldt 36' | Attendance: 46,076; Referee: Alfred Wieser |

| 29 May 2005 36 | Austria Wien | 5-1 | Admira Wacker Mödling | Franz Horr Stadium, Vienna |
| 15:30 | Kitzbichler 9'; Dosunmu 46'; Dheedene 75'; Doğan 84'; Ratajczyk 90+1' | Report | Dunst 60' | Attendance: 4,662; Referee: Konrad Plautz |

=== Austrian Cup ===
| 20 April 2005 Round of 16 | Sturm Graz | 0–0 (a.e.t.) (3–5 p) | Austria Wien | Graz |
| 19:00 | | Report | | Stadium: Arnold-Schwarzenegger-Stadion; Attendance: 3,302; Referee: Thomas Einwaller |
| | Penalties |
| | Säumel (penalty scored); Dağ (penalty scored); Kienzl (penalty missed); Gërçaliu (penalty scored) | | (penalty scored) Vastić; (penalty scored) Mila; (penalty scored) Dheedene; (penalty scored) Papac; (penalty scored) Wagner |

| 27 April 2005 Quarter-finals | St. Pölten | 0–6 | Austria Wien | Sankt Pölten |
| 19:30 | | Report | Vastić 27' (pen.), 69'; Petrouš 47'; Gilewicz 51'; Dosunmu 72'; Kitzbichler 86' | Stadium: Voithplatz; Attendance: 4,500; Referee: Wolfgang Falb |

| 18 May 2005 Semi-finals | Austria Wien | 3–0 | FC Kärnten | Vienna |
| 19:15 | Sionko 18'; Vastić 36' (pen.); Rushfeldt 62' | Report | | Stadium: Franz Horr Stadium; Attendance: 2,500; Referee: Thomas Gangl |

| 1 June 2005 Final | Austria Wien | 3–1 | Rapid Wien | Vienna |
| 20:15 | Mila 20'; Vastić 55'; Sionko 65' | Report | Burgstaller 5' | Stadium: Ernst-Happel-Stadion; Attendance: 28,000; Referee: Wolfgang Sowa |

=== UEFA Cup ===
==== Qualifying rounds ====
===== Second qualifying round =====
| 12 August 2004 First leg | Illichivets Mariupol (Ukraine) | 0–0 | Austria Wien | Mariupol, Ukraine |
| 18:00 | | Report | | Stadium: Illichivets Stadium; Attendance: 13,000; Referee: Paulius Malžinskas (Lithuania) |

| 26 August 2004 Second leg | Austria Wien | 3–0 (3–0 agg.) | (Ukraine) Illichivets Mariupol | Vienna, Austria |
| 20:45 | Sionko 31'; Vastić 53' (pen.), 61' (pen.) | Report | | Stadium: Franz Horr Stadium; Attendance: 5,800; Referee: Martin Hansson (Sweden) |

==== First round ====
| 16 September 2004 First leg | Austria Wien | 1–0 | (Poland) Legia Warsaw | Vienna, Austria |
| 20:45 | Kiesenebner 83' | Report | | Stadium: Ernst-Happel-Stadion; Attendance: 19,000; Referee: Vitaliy Godulyan (Ukraine) |

| 30 September 2004 Second leg | Legia Warsaw (Poland) | 1–3 (1–4 agg.) | Austria Wien | Warsaw, Poland |
| 20:45 | Smoliński 84' | Report | Vachoušek 32'; Poledica 42' (o.g.); Sionko 90' | Stadium: Polish Army Stadium; Attendance: 5,000; Referee: Nicolai Vollquartz (Denmark) |

==== Group stage ====
The group stage draw was held on 5 October 2004.

| Pos | Team | Pld | W | D | L | GF | GA | GD | Pts | Qualification | DNI | ZAR | AUS | BRU | UTR |
|---|---|---|---|---|---|---|---|---|---|---|---|---|---|---|---|
| 1 | (Ukraine) Dnipro Dnipropetrovsk | 4 | 3 | 0 | 1 | 7 | 5 | +2 | 9 | Advance to knockout stage | — | — | 1–0 | 3–2 | — |
| 2 | (Spain) Zaragoza | 4 | 2 | 1 | 1 | 5 | 3 | +2 | 7 | Advance to knockout stage | 2–1 | — | — | — | 2–0 |
| 3 | Austria Wien | 4 | 2 | 1 | 1 | 4 | 3 | +1 | 7 | Advance to knockout stage | — | 1–0 | — | 1–1 | — |
| 4 | (Belgium) Club Brugge | 4 | 1 | 2 | 1 | 5 | 5 | 0 | 5 | | — | 1–1 | — | — | 1–0 |
| 5 | (Netherlands) Utrecht | 4 | 0 | 0 | 4 | 2 | 7 | −5 | 0 | | 1–2 | — | 1–2 | — | — |

Source: RSSSF

| 4 November 2004 1 | Austria Wien | 1–0 | (Spain) Real Zaragoza | Vienna, Austria |
| 20:45 | Gilewicz 70' | Report | | Stadium: Ernst-Happel-Stadion; Attendance: 18,800; Referee: Paolo Bertini (Italy) |

| 25 November 2004 2 | Dnipro Dnipropetrovsk (Ukraine) | 1–0 | Austria Wien | Dnipropetrovsk, Ukraine |
| 18:45 | Nazarenko 19' | Report | | Stadium: Meteor Stadium; Attendance: 12,000; Referee: Krzysztof Slupik (Poland) |

| 1 December 2004 3 | Austria Wien | 1–1 | (Belgium) Club Brugge | Vienna, Austria |
| 20:45 | Gilewicz 50'; Papac (yellow card) 90' (red card) | Report | Lange 90'; Simões (red card) 89' | Stadium: Ernst-Happel-Stadion; Attendance: 20,000; Referee: Rob Styles (England) |

| 16 December 2004 4 | Utrecht (Netherlands) | 1–2 | Austria Wien | Utrecht, Netherlands |
| 20:45 | Douglas 54' | Report | Sionko 14'; Rushfeldt 78' | Stadium: Stadion Galgenwaard; Attendance: 14,000; Referee: Athanassios Briakos (Greece) |

==== Knockout phase ====
===== Round of 32 =====
| 24 February 2005 First leg | Austria Wien | 0–0 | (Spain) Athletic Bilbao | Vienna, Austria |
| 19:30 (CET) | | Report | | Stadium: Ernst-Happel-Stadion; Attendance: 17,400; Referee: Alon Yefet (Israel) |

| 27 February 2005 Second leg | Athletic Bilbao (Spain) | 1–2 (1–2 agg.) | Austria Wien | Bilbao, Spain |
| 18:00 (CET) | Yeste 19' (pen.) | Report | Sionko 35', 70' | Stadium: San Mamés Stadium; Attendance: 38,000; Referee: Grzegorz Gilewski (Poland) |

===== Round of 16 =====
| 10 March 2005 First leg | Austria Wien | 1–1 | (Spain) Real Zaragoza | Vienna, Austria |
| 19:30 (CET) | Rushfeldt 32' | Report | Sávio 74' | Stadium: Ernst-Happel-Stadion; Attendance: 21,000; Referee: Peter Fröjdfeldt (Sweden) |

| 17 March 2005 Second leg | Real Zaragoza (Spain) | 2–2 (3–3 (a) agg.) | Austria Wien | Zaragoza, Spain |
| 20:45 (CET) | Villa 59'; Galletti 63' | Report | Papac 6'; Dosunmu 12' | Stadium: La Romareda; Attendance: 25,000; Referee: Alain Hamer (Luxembourg) |

==== Quarter-finals ====
| 7 April 2005 First leg | Austria Wien | 1–1 | (Italy) Parma | Vienna, Austria |
| 20:45 (CET) | Mila 61' | Report | Pisanu 34' | Stadium: Ernst-Happel-Stadion; Attendance: 39,000; Referee: Éric Poulat (France) |

| 14 April 2005 Second leg | Parma (Italy) | 0–0 (1–1 (a) agg.) | Austria Wien | Parma, Italy |
| 20:45 (CET) | | Report | | Stadium: Stadio Ennio Tardini; Attendance: 15,000; Referee: Steve Bennett (England) |
