= 2004–05 SK Rapid Wien season =

Rapid Wien
2004–05 season
- President: Rudolf Edlinger
- Coach: Josef Hickersberger
- Stadium: Gerhard Hanappi Stadium, Vienna, Austria
- Bundesliga: Champion (31st title)
- ÖFB-Cup: Runner-up
- UEFA Cup: First round
- Top goalscorer: League: Axel Lawarée (13); All: Axel Lawarée (15)
- Highest home attendance: 46,000
- Lowest home attendance: 8,400

The 2004–05 SK Rapid Wien season is the 107th season in club history.

== Squad statistics ==
No.	Nat.	Name	Age	League		Cup		UEFA Cup		Total		Discipline	
No.	Nat.	Name	Age	Apps	Goals	Apps	Goals	Apps	Goals	Apps	Goals	Booked	Sent off (straight red)
Goalkeepers
1	(Czech Republic)	Ladislav Maier	38	5+1				1		6+1		1	
24	(Austria)	Helge Payer	24	23		4				27		2	
30	(Austria)	Jürgen Macho	26	8				3		11			
Defenders
2	(Poland)	Marcin Adamski	28	9+5				3+1		12+6			
2	(Czech Republic)	Jiří Lenko	19	1+1		0+2				1+3		1	
3	(Austria)	Ferdinand Feldhofer	24	28+1	4	4		3+1		35+2	4	8	
4	(Austria)	Martin Hiden	31	20		1		3		24		4	1
6	(Hungary)	György Korsós	27	25+2	2	3+1		3+1		31+4	2	4	1
12	(Austria) (Note: Garics was born in Szombathely, Hungary, but was raised in Austria from the age of 14 and represented them at U-21 level before making his international debut for Austria in October 2006.)	György Garics	20	11+7	1	2+1		1		14+8	1		
13	(Austria)	Markus Katzer	24	28+3	4	1	1	3+1		32+4	5	3	
14	(Austria)	Thomas Burgstaller	24	5+5		1	1	0+1		6+6	1	2	
18	(Austria)	Markus Hiden	26	10+3		4				14+3		1	
23	(Austria)	Andreas Dober	18	0+1		0+1				0+2			
26	(Slovakia)	Jozef Valachovič	28	12		2				14			
29	(Austria)	Daniel Schreiner	18	1						1		1	
Midfielders
7	(Slovakia)	Peter Hlinka	25	33+1	1	2	1	4		39+1	2	10	
8	(Austria)	Andreas Ivanschitz	20	25+4	5	3	1	4		32+4	6	4	
11	(Germany)	Steffen Hofmann	23	30+2	8	3	2	4	2	37+2	12	3	
15	(Austria)	Stefan Kulovits	21	18+10		1+2		1+1		20+13		5	
16	(Austria)	Sebastián Martínez	26	22+13	8	3+1	1	3+1		28+15	9	5	
17	(Austria)	Veli Kavlak	15	1+1						1+1		1	
19	(Austria)	Florian Sturm	22	10+8	1	3+1		1+2		14+11	1	1	
Forwards
9	(Belgium)	Axel Lawarée	30	22+7	13	1+3	2	1+2		24+12	15	1	
10	(Czech Republic)	Tomáš Došek	25	20+8	7	2	1	4		26+8	8		
17	(Bosnia and Herzegovina)	Eldar Topić	21	0+3				0+1		0+4			
20	(Austria)	Roman Kienast	20	5+16	2					5+16	2	1	
21	(Austria)	René Gartler	18	0+3						0+3		1	
25	(Czech Republic)	Marek Kincl	31	24+3	9	4		2	1	30+3	10	4	

=== Goal scorers ===
Rank	Name	Bundesliga	Cup	UEFA Cup	Total
1	(Belgium) Axel Lawarée	13	2		15
2	(Germany) Steffen Hofmann	8	2	2	12
3	(Czech Republic) Marek Kincl	9		1	10
4	(Austria) Sebastián Martínez	8	1		9
5	(Czech Republic) Tomáš Došek	7	1		8
6	(Austria) Andreas Ivanschitz	5	1		6
7	(Austria) Markus Katzer	4	1		5
8	(Austria) Ferdinand Feldhofer	4			4
9	(Slovakia) Peter Hlinka	1	1		2
9	(Austria) Roman Kienast	2			2
9	(Hungary) György Korsós	2			2
12	(Austria) Thomas Burgstaller		1		1
12	(Austria) György Garics	1			1
12	(Austria) Florian Sturm	1			1
OG	(Austria) Ronald Gercaliu (Sturm)	1			1
OG	(Austria) Christoph Jank (Salzburg)	1			1
Totals		67	10	3	80

== Fixtures and results ==
Win Draw Loss

=== Bundesliga ===
Rd	Date	Venue	Opponent	Res.	Att.	Goals and discipline
1	14.07.2004	A	SW Bregenz	5–1	5,000	Ivanschitz 6' 62', Kincl 21', Došek 53', Katzer 90'
2	21.07.2004	H	Wacker Innsbruck	4–1	15,300	Kincl 16' 77', Hlinka 42', Ivanschitz 63'
3	01.08.2004	A	Austria Wien	1–1	11,800	Kincl 12'
4	07.08.2004	H	Austria Salzburg	0–0	12,400	
5	15.08.2004	A	Sturm Graz	1–0	8,420	Lawarée 80'
6	21.08.2004	H	Mattersburg	3–0	10,400	Lawarée 50' 61', Kincl 52'
7	29.08.2004	A	Pasching	1–2	7,500	Kincl 24'
8	11.09.2004	H	Admira	2–1	9,700	Hofmann S. 21', Feldhofer 31'
9	18.09.2004	H	GAK	2–1	13,200	Kienast R. 7', Došek 84'; Korsós (yellow card) 68' (red card)
10	25.09.2004	A	GAK	2–2	10,841	Ivanschitz 11', Martínez 55'
11	03.10.2004	H	SW Bregenz	2–1	8,400	Došek 22', Sturm F. 73'
12	16.10.2004	A	Wacker Innsbruck	2–0	9,400	Katzer 3', Korsós 49'
13	24.10.2004	H	Austria Wien	1–1	17,500	Katzer 54'
14	27.10.2004	A	Austria Salzburg	1–0	10,000	Korsós 49'
15	31.10.2004	H	Sturm Graz	2–0	13,200	Kienast R. 63', Gercaliu 67' (o.g.)
16	06.11.2004	A	Mattersburg	0–0	17,100	
17	13.11.2004	H	Pasching	3–0	14,800	Feldhofer 2', Hofmann S. 17' 75'
18	20.11.2004	A	Admira	0–1	8,000	
19	27.11.2004	H	Sturm Graz	4–1	8,800	Martínez 23', Došek 58', Hofmann S. 83', Kincl 90+2'
20	04.12.2004	A	Pasching	1–1	8,968	Hofmann S. 76' (pen.)
21	08.12.2004	H	Wacker Innsbruck	2–2	10,000	Došek 84', Martínez 90+1'
22	11.05.2005	A	Admira	1–0	10,500	Feldhofer 90+2'
23	06.04.2005	A	SW Bregenz	2–0	2,500	Lawarée 34' 84'
24	05.05.2005	H	Austria Salzburg	5–0	14,300	Jank 5' (o.g.), Lawarée 13' 34', Hofmann S. 43', Martínez 45'
25	13.03.2005	A	Austria Wien	0–1	11,000	
26	19.03.2005	H	GAK	1–0	10,600	Lawarée 82'
27	02.04.2005	A	Mattersburg	0–1	16,300	
28	09.04.2005	H	Mattersburg	2–1	10,600	Katzer 45', Kincl 74'
29	16.04.2005	A	Sturm Graz	1–1	8,422	Ivanschitz 54'
30	23.04.2005	H	Pasching	2–1	16,500	Martínez 21', Hofmann S. 88'
31	30.04.2005	A	Wacker Innsbruck	2–1	8,400	Martínez 56', Lawarée 73'
32	07.05.2005	H	Admira	6–0	13,600	Martínez 27', Lawarée 36' 65', Feldhofer 83', Došek 86' 87'
33	14.05.2005	H	SW Bregenz	4–1	17,205	Lawarée 2' 78', Hofmann S. 19' (pen.), Kincl 81'
34	21.05.2005	A	Austria Salzburg	1–4	11,640	Garics 90+5'
35	26.05.2005	H	Austria Wien	0–1	46,000	
36	29.05.2005	A	GAK	1–3	13,471	Martínez 88'

==== League table ====
Pos	Team	Pld	W	D	L	GF	GA	GD	Pts	Qualification or relegation
1	Rapid Wien (C)	36	21	8	7	67	31	+36	71	Qualification to Champions League second qualifying round
2	Grazer AK	36	21	7	8	58	28	+30	70	Qualification to UEFA Cup second qualifying round
3	Austria Wien	36	19	12	5	64	24	+40	69	Qualification to UEFA Cup second qualifying round
4	Pasching	36	17	9	10	53	48	+5	60	Qualification to UEFA Cup second qualifying round
5	Mattersburg	36	12	9	15	48	58	−10	45	

Source: weltfussball.de (in German)
Rules for classification: 1) points; 2) goal difference; 3) number of goals scored.
(C) Champions

=== Cup ===
Rd	Date	Venue	Opponent	Res.	Att.	Goals and discipline
R16	16.03.2005	A	Austria Salzburg II	2–0	2,000	Ivanschitz 28', Lawarée 81'
QF	12.04.2005	A	Mattersburg	3–1	9,000	Hlinka 10', Došek 61', Katzer 68'
SF	17.05.2005	H	GAK	4–1	11,100	Hofmann S. 8' 64', Martínez 90', Lawarée 90+4'
F	01.06.2005	N	Austria Wien	1–3	28,000	Burgstaller T. 5'

=== UEFA Cup ===
Rd	Date	Venue	Opponent	Res.	Att.	Goals and discipline
Q2-L1	12.08.2004	H	Rubin Kazan (Russia)	0–2	12,000	Hiden Mart. (yellow card) 67' (red card)
Q2-L2	26.08.2004	A	Rubin Kazan (Russia)	3–0	12,000	Hofmann S. 18' 70', Kincl 30'
R1-L1	16.09.2004	A	Sporting CP (Portugal)	0–2	19,861	
R1-L2	30.09.2004	H	Sporting CP (Portugal)	0–0	17,500	
