= 2005–06 SK Rapid Wien season =

Rapid Wien
2005–06 season
- President: Rudolf Edlinger
- Coach: Josef Hickersberger / Georg Zellhofer
- Stadium: Gerhard Hanappi Stadium, Vienna, Austria
- Bundesliga: 5th
- ÖFB-Cup: Quarterfinals
- Champions League: Group stage
- Top goalscorer: League: Marek Kincl (11); All: Marek Kincl (13)
- Highest home attendance: 19,200
- Lowest home attendance: 7,800

The 2005–06 SK Rapid Wien season is the 108th season in club history.

== Squad statistics ==
No.	Nat.	Name	Age	League		Cup		Champions League		Total		Discipline	
No.	Nat.	Name	Age	Apps	Goals	Apps	Goals	Apps	Goals	Apps	Goals	Booked	Sent off (straight red)
Goalkeepers
1	(Austria)	Raimund Hedl	30	4				2		6			
24	(Austria)	Helge Payer	25	32		2		8		42		2	
Defenders
2	(Poland)	Marcin Adamski	29	18+3		1		8		27+3		5	
3	(Slovakia)	Vladimír Labant	31	7+1						7+1		1	
4	(Austria)	Martin Hiden	32	19		1		3+1		23+1		3	
12	(Austria)	György Garics	21	18+10		2		1+2		21+12		4	1
13	(Austria)	Markus Katzer	25	12+1		1		2		15+1		1	
14	(Austria)	Thomas Burgstaller	25	4+1		1				5+1		1	
18	(Austria)	Markus Hiden	27	4+1		1+1				5+2		1	
22	(Czech Republic)	Radek Bejbl	32	29+3	2	0+1		8		37+4	2	6	1
23	(Austria)	Andreas Dober	19	18+5	1			7+1		25+6	1	12	
26	(Slovakia)	Jozef Valachovic	29	29+1	5	2		8+1	2	39+2	7	1	1
28	(Austria)	Cemil Tosun	18					1		1			
Midfielders
6	(Hungary)	György Korsós	28	21+5				10		31+5		2	
7	(Slovakia)	Peter Hlinka	26	23+5	3	2		10		35+5	3	8	
8	(Croatia)	Mario Bazina	29	9+1	1	2				11+1	1	2	1
15	(Austria)	Stefan Kulovits	22	8+2		1				9+2		2	
16	(Austria)	Sebastián Martínez	27	23+9	3	1+1		2+8		26+18	3	10	
17	(Austria)	Veli Kavlak	16	9+5	2	2		0+1		11+6	2	4	
19	(Austria)	Matthias Dollinger	25	4+10				2+4	1	6+14	1	4	
27	(Austria)	Helmut Prenner	26	0+2				1		1+2			
Forwards
9	(Belgium)	Axel Lawarée	31	14+12	4			5+2	4	19+14	8	2	
10	(Austria)	Muhammet Akagündüz	27	25+9	9	2	1	6+3	2	33+12	12	3	
20	(Austria)	Roman Kienast	21	1+9	1			1+2	1	2+11	2		
25	(Czech Republic)	Marek Kincl	32	28+7	11	1+1		8+1	2	37+9	13	8	
Players who left after the start of the season
8	(Austria)	Andreas Ivanschitz	21	18	5			8		26	5	2	
11	(Germany)	Steffen Hofmann	24	19+1	3			9	2	28+1	5	1	

=== Goal scorers ===
Rank	Name	Bundesliga	Cup	Champions League	Total
1	(Czech Republic) Marek Kincl	11		2	13
2	(Austria) Muhammet Akagündüz	9	1	2	12
3	(Belgium) Axel Lawaree	4		4	8
4	(Slovakia) Jozef Valachovic	5		2	7
5	(Germany) Steffen Hofmann	3		2	5
5	(Austria) Andreas Ivanschitz	5			5
7	(Slovakia) Peter Hlinka	3			3
7	(Austria) Sebastian Martinez	3			3
9	(Czech Republic) Radek Bejbl	2			2
9	(Austria) Veli Kavlak	2			2
9	(Austria) Roman Kienast	1		1	2
12	(Croatia) Mario Bazina	1			1
12	(Austria) Andreas Dober	1			1
12	(Austria) Matthias Dollinger			1	1
OG	(Austria) Markus Berger (Ried)	1			1
Totals		51	1	14	66

== Fixtures and results ==
Win Draw Loss

=== Bundesliga ===
Rd	Date	Venue	Opponent	Res.	Att.	Goals and discipline
1	13.07.2005	H	Sturm Graz	2–3	16,200	Kincl 57' 87'
2	19.07.2005	A	Wacker Innsbruck	3–0	9,100	Kincl 35', Akagündüz 42', Ivanschitz 51'
3	23.07.2005	H	Pasching	2–0	10,400	Valachovic 79', Lawarée 89'
4	30.07.2005	A	RB Salzburg	2–0	18,000	Kincl 63', Ivanschitz 80'
5	06.08.2005	H	Austria Wien	3–1	17,500	Hlinka 32', Valachovic 72' (pen.), Hofmann S. 89'
6	14.08.2005	A	GAK	1–1	10,000	Kincl 17'
7	20.08.2005	H	Mattersburg	1–2	13,200	Hlinka 63'
8	27.08.2005	A	Ried	2–2	7,600	Lawarée 54', Kincl 65'
9	10.09.2005	A	Admira	1–1	8,200	Kienast R. 90+1'
10	17.09.2005	H	Admira	0–1	9,400	
11	20.09.2005	A	Sturm Graz	2–2	7,628	Bejbl 27', Valachovic 42'
12	24.09.2005	H	Wacker Innsbruck	2–0	10,200	Hlinka 58', Akagündüz 71'
13	01.10.2005	A	Pasching	0–2	7,500	
14	15.10.2005	H	RB Salzburg	2–3	15,800	Hofmann S. 15', Kincl 73'
15	22.10.2005	A	Austria Wien	2–0	11,800	Lawarée 29', Kincl 69'
16	25.10.2005	H	GAK	3–2	12,600	Ivanschitz 43' 90', Martínez 61'
17	29.10.2005	A	Mattersburg	0–0	15,800	
18	05.11.2005	H	Ried	2–2	10,700	Bejbl 25', Akagündüz 36'
19	19.11.2005	H	Sturm Graz	3–1	11,800	Akagündüz 11', Kincl 30', Martínez 61'
20	26.11.2005	A	Wacker Innsbruck	0–0	5,100	
21	03.12.2005	H	Pasching	3–1	9,700	Hofmann S. 23', Ivanschitz 45' (pen.), Akagündüz 74'
22	10.12.2005	A	RB Salzburg	0–2	16,800	Valachovic (red card) 85'
23	18.02.2006	H	Mattersburg	2–0	9,400	Akagündüz 53', Bazina 90+2'; Bazina (yellow card) 90+2' (red card)
24	25.02.2006	A	GAK	1–3	6,012	Kincl 43'
25	05.03.2006	H	Austria Wien	0–3	19,200	
26	12.03.2006	A	Ried	0–0	7,200	
27	29.03.2006	H	Admira	0–1	7,800	Bejbl (red card) 70'
28	25.03.2006	A	Admira	1–2	4,500	Akagündüz 90+4'
29	01.04.2006	A	Sturm Graz	0–0	8,902	
30	08.04.2006	H	Wacker Innsbruck	2–1	10,400	Akagündüz 17', Valachovic 37'
31	11.04.2006	A	Pasching	0–1	6,600	
32	15.04.2006	H	RB Salzburg	0–1	16,500	
33	23.04.2006	A	Austria Wien	1–3	18,400	Martínez 7'
34	29.04.2006	H	GAK	2–0	9,800	Valachovic 57', Lawarée 60'
35	06.05.2006	A	Mattersburg	0–0	13,300	
36	13.05.2006	H	Ried	6–0	12,600	Kavlak 25' 35', Berger 41' (o.g.), Akagündüz 43', Kincl 67', Dober 90'

==== League table ====
Pos	Team	Pld	W	D	L	GF	GA	GD	Pts	Qualification or relegation
3	Pasching	36	16	10	10	43	32	+11	58	Qualification to UEFA Cup first round
4	Ried	36	13	13	10	48	47	+1	52	Qualification to Intertoto Cup second round
5	Rapid Wien	36	13	10	13	51	41	+10	49	
6	Grazer AK	36	13	6	17	47	48	−1	45	
7	Mattersburg	36	12	8	16	40	54	−14	44	Qualification to UEFA Cup second qualifying round (Note: Champions League-bound Austria Wien won the 2005–06 Austrian Cup, so cup runners-up Mattersburg will enter the second qualifying round of UEFA Cup.)

Source: weltfussball.de (in German)
Rules for classification: 1) points; 2) goal difference; 3) number of goals scored.

=== Cup ===
Rd	Date	Venue	Opponent	Res.	Att.	Goals and discipline
R16	08.03.2006	A	Lustenau	1–1 (3–1 p)	3,500	Akagündüz 26'
QF	04.04.2006	A	Mattersburg	0–1	12,000	Garics (yellow card) 72' (red card)

=== Champions League ===
==== Qualification rounds ====
Rd	Date	Venue	Opponent	Res.	Att.	Goals and discipline
Q2-L1	27.07.2005	A	Dudelange (Luxembourg)	6–1	1,557	Lawarée 2' 64', Akagündüz 3' 16', Hofmann S. 5', Kienast R. 84'
Q2-L2	03.08.2005	H	Dudelange (Luxembourg)	3–2	8,900	Lawarée 47' 81', Dollinger 86'
Q3-L1	10.08.2005	H	Lokomotiv Moscow (Russia)	1–1	17,455	Valachovic 74' (pen.)
Q3-L2	23.08.2005	A	Lokomotiv Moscow (Russia)	1–0	26,000	Valachovic 84'

==== Group stage ====
Rd	Date	Venue	Opponent	Res.	Att.	Goals and discipline
G1	14.09.2005	H	Bayern (Germany)	0–1	47,800	
G2	27.09.2005	A	Juventus (Italy)	0–3	11,156	
G3	18.10.2005	H	Club Brugge (Belgium)	0–1	46,000	
G4	02.11.2005	A	Club Brugge (Belgium)	2–3	27,800	Kincl 1', Hofmann S. 81'
G5	22.11.2005	A	Bayern (Germany)	0–4	66,000	
G6	07.12.2005	H	Juventus (Italy)	1–3	46,000	Kincl 52'
