= 2006–07 SK Rapid Wien season =

Rapid Wien
2006–07 season
- President: Rudolf Edlinger
- Coach: Georg Zellhofer / Peter Pacult
- Stadium: Gerhard Hanappi Stadium, Vienna, Austria
- Bundesliga: 4th
- ÖFB-Cup: 1st round
- Top goalscorer: League: Mate Bilić (11); All: Mate Bilić (11)
- Highest home attendance: 17,500
- Lowest home attendance: 11,600

The 2006–07 SK Rapid Wien season is the 109th season in club history.

== Squad statistics ==
No.	Nat.	Name	Age	League		Cup		Total		Discipline	
No.	Nat.	Name	Age	Apps	Goals	Apps	Goals	Apps	Goals	Booked	Sent off (straight red)
Goalkeepers
1	(Austria)	Raimund Hedl	31	2		1		3		1	
24	(Austria)	Helge Payer	26	34				34			
Defenders
2	(Austria)	Gernot Plassenegger	28	11		1		12		5	
3	(Austria)	Thomas Burgstaller	26	1+6				1+6		2	1
4	(Austria)	Martin Hiden	33	32	2	1	1	33	3	10	
6	(Austria)	Christian Thonhofer	21	0+6				0+6		1	
12	(Austria)	György Garics	22	6				6		2	
13	(Austria)	Markus Katzer	26	27+1	2			27+1	2	7	
16	(Austria)	Mario Sara	24	9+3		1		10+3		4	
18	(Austria)	Hannes Eder	22	9				9		8	
23	(Austria)	Andreas Dober	20	12				12		5	2
26	(Slovakia)	Jozef Valachovic	30	27+2	2	1		28+2	2	6	1
Midfielders
7	(Slovakia)	Peter Hlinka	27	21+10	7	1		22+10	7	6	1
8	(Czech Republic)	Petr Vorisek	27	19+12	4			19+12	4	7	
11	(Germany)	Steffen Hofmann	25	19	1			19	1	3	
14	(Austria)	Ümit Korkmaz	20	19+5	1	0+1		19+6	1	3	
15	(Austria)	Stefan Kulovits	23	10				10		3	
17	(Austria)	Veli Kavlak	17	27+2	3	1		28+2	3	4	
19	(Austria)	Matthias Dollinger	26	7+3		1		8+3		3	
22	(Czech Republic)	Radek Bejbl	33	23+4	1	1		24+4	1	3	
27	(Montenegro)	Branko Boskovic	26	10+2	2			10+2	2	5	
Forwards
9	(Croatia)	Mate Bilic	25	22+13	11	1		23+13	11	4	
10	(Croatia)	Mario Bazina	30	22+6	8	1		23+6	8	2	
21	(Austria)	Erwin Hoffer	19	8+13	4	0+1		8+14	4	1	
25	(Czech Republic)	Marek Kincl	33	19+12	7	0+1		19+13	7	5	1

=== Goal scorers ===
Rank	Name	Bundesliga	Cup	Total
1	(Croatia) Mate Bilic	11		11
2	(Croatia) Mario Bazina	8		8
3	(Slovakia) Peter Hlinka	7		7
3	(Czech Republic) Marek Kincl	7		7
5	(Austria) Erwin Hoffer	4		4
5	(Czech Republic) Petr Vorisek	4		4
7	(Austria) Martin Hiden	2	1	3
7	(Austria) Veli Kavlak	3		3
9	(Montenegro) Branko Boskovic	2		2
9	(Austria) Markus Katzer	2		2
9	(Slovakia) Jozef Valachovic	2		2
12	(Czech Republic) Radek Bejbl	1		1
12	(Germany) Steffen Hofmann	1		1
12	(Austria) Ümit Korkmaz	1		1
Totals		55	1	56

== Fixtures and results ==
Win Draw Loss

=== Bundesliga ===
Rd	Date	Venue	Opponent	Res.	Att.	Goals and discipline
1	19.07.2006	A	Mattersburg	0-1	15,000	
2	23.07.2006	H	Sturm Graz	4-1	16,900	Bilic 10', Valachovic 13', Hlinka 20', Bazina 86'
3	29.07.2006	A	Ried	0-1	7,600	
4	06.08.2006	H	Altach	3-2	15,000	Bilic 18', Bejbl 35', Katzer 76'
5	12.08.2006	A	Austria Wien	0-0	11,200	
6	20.08.2006	H	GAK	1-4	14,400	Bilic 75'
7	26.08.2006	A	Pasching	0-1	6,250	
8	10.09.2006	H	RB Salzburg	1-1	17,000	Kavlak 31'; Dober (yellow card) 80' (red card)
9	16.09.2006	A	Wacker Innsbruck	2-2	9,100	Vorisek 49', Hlinka 79'
10	23.09.2006	H	Wacker Innsbruck	1-1	14,700	Kincl 2'
11	30.09.2006	H	Mattersburg	4-1	14,800	Kincl 27', Hlinka 52', Hiden Mart. 88', Bilic 90+3'
12	15.10.2006	A	Sturm Graz	0-2	8,138	
13	21.10.2006	H	Ried	2-2	11,600	Hoffer 79', Bilic 88'
14	28.10.2006	A	Altach	1-3	8,900	Kavlak 12'; Dober (yellow card) 82' (red card)
15	05.11.2006	H	Austria Wien	1-1	16,500	Hlinka 20'
16	08.11.2006	A	GAK	1-1	5,210	Hoffer 55'
17	11.11.2006	H	Pasching	1-1	11,800	Vorisek 90+2'
18	19.11.2006	A	RB Salzburg	0-4	17,800	
19	25.11.2006	A	Mattersburg	0-1	15,000	Burgstaller T. (red card) 72'
20	02.12.2006	H	Sturm Graz	3-0	11,800	Hlinka 36' (pen.) 86', Bilic 54'
21	09.12.2006	A	Ried	2-1	7,000	Bilic 13', Vorisek 60'
22	24.02.2007	H	Altach	2-1	15,400	Kincl 38' 69'
23	04.03.2007	A	Austria Wien	1-2	11,500	Valachovic 82'
24	11.03.2007	H	GAK	1-0	15,400	Hofmann S. 38' (pen.)
25	17.03.2007	A	Pasching	1-0	6,300	Bazina 53'
26	31.03.2007	H	RB Salzburg	2-2	17,000	Kincl 63' 89'
27	07.04.2007	A	Wacker Innsbruck	3-2	6,100	Korkmaz 3', Bazina 45', Katzer 47'
28	14.04.2007	H	Wacker Innsbruck	2-1	17,400	Kavlak 4', Kincl 50'
29	17.04.2007	H	Mattersburg	2-2	14,500	Hiden Mart. 12', Bazina 44'; Hlinka (yellow card) 76' (red card)
30	22.04.2007	A	Sturm Graz	0-1	10,890	Kincl (yellow card) 52' (red card)
31	29.04.2007	H	Ried	5-2	15,200	Bilic 20' 40' 54', Bazina 45', Boskovic 46'
32	05.05.2007	A	Altach	1-2	4,700	Hlinka 83'
33	08.05.2007	H	Austria Wien	3-0	17,000	Bilic 4', Boskovic 32', Bazina 56' (pen.)
34	13.05.2007	A	GAK	2-0	3,500	Hoffer 73' 83'
35	17.05.2007	H	Pasching	2-0	17,500	Vorisek 20', Bazina 24'
36	20.05.2007	A	RB Salzburg	1-3	18,000	Bazina 21'

==== League table ====
Pos	Team	Pld	W	D	L	GF	GA	GD	Pts	Qualification or relegation
2	Ried	36	15	11	10	47	42	+5	56	Qualification to UEFA Cup first qualifying round
3	Mattersburg	36	16	7	13	61	58	+3	55	Qualification to UEFA Cup first qualifying round
4	Rapid Wien	36	14	10	12	55	49	+6	52	Qualification to Intertoto Cup second round
5	Pasching	36	14	10	12	47	41	+6	52	
6	Austria Wien	36	11	12	13	43	43	0	45	Qualification to UEFA Cup second qualifying round (Note: Austria Wien won the 2006–07 Austrian Cup and therefore qualified for the second qualifying round of the UEFA Cup.)

Source: weltfussball.de (in German)
Rules for classification: 1) points; 2) goal difference; 3) number of goals scored.

=== Cup ===
Rd	Date	Venue	Opponent	Res.	Att.	Goals and discipline
R1	13.09.2006	A	Vienna	1-1 (2-3 p)	5,500	Hiden Mart. 46'; Valachovic (red card) 32'
