= 2000–01 SK Sturm Graz season =

SK Sturm Graz
2000–01 season
- Chairman: (Austria) Hannes Kartnig
- Manager: (Bosnia and Herzegovina) Ivica Osim
- Austrian Football Bundesliga: 4th
- Champions League: Second group stage

== First-team squad ==
Squad at end of season

Note: Flags indicate national team as defined under FIFA eligibility rules; some limited exceptions apply. Players may hold more than one non-FIFA nationality.

No.	Pos.	Nation	Player
1	GK	POL	Kazimierz Sidorczuk
2	MF	SVK	Peter Hlinka
3	DF	AUT	Günther Neukirchner (vice-captain)
5	DF	GER	Franco Foda
6	MF	AUT	Roman Mählich
7	FW	AUT	Gerald Strafner
8	MF	GER	Markus Schupp
9	FW	AUT	Hannes Reinmayr
10	MF	AUT	Ivica Vastić (captain)
11	DF	HUN	György Korsós
12	DF	AUT	Gilbert Prilasnig
14	FW	BEL	Jan-Pieter Martens
15	DF	RUS	Ramiz Mamedov
16	DF	AUT	Ferdinand Feldhofer

No.	Pos.	Nation	Player
18	MF	AUT	Markus Schopp
19	FW	HUN	Imre Szabics
20	MF	IRN	Mehrdad Minavand
21	FW	AUT	Tomica Kocijan
22	GK	AUT	Josef Schicklgruber
23	DF	AUT	Robert Ibertsberger
24	DF	YUG	Ranko Popović
25	GK	AUT	Alexander Knezevic
26	FW	UKR	Sergei Yuran
27	MF	GRE	Georgios Koutsoupias
28	DF	AUT	Emmanuel Atangana
29	GK	NGA	Abiodun Baruwa
30	MF	URU	Andrés Fleurquin
31	FW	AUT	Mario Haas

=== Left club during season ===
Note: Flags indicate national team as defined under FIFA eligibility rules; some limited exceptions apply. Players may hold more than one non-FIFA nationality.

No.	Pos.	Nation	Player
2	DF	GER	Michael Bochtler

== Competitions ==
=== Bundesliga ===
==== League table ====
Pos	Team	Pld	W	D	L	GF	GA	GD	Pts	Qualification or relegation
2	Rapid Wien	36	16	12	8	62	36	+26	60	Qualification to UEFA Cup qualifying round
3	Grazer AK	36	16	9	11	49	40	+9	57	Qualification to UEFA Cup qualifying round
4	Sturm Graz	36	16	7	13	58	44	+14	55	Qualification to Intertoto Cup second round
5	Austria Wien	36	14	8	14	47	43	+4	50	
6	Austria Salzburg	36	13	10	13	49	45	+4	49	

Source: weltfussball.de (in German)
Rules for classification: 1) points; 2) goal difference; 3) number of goals scored.

=== Champions League ===
==== Second qualifying round ====
26 July 2000	Sturm Graz (Austria)	3–0	(Israel) Hapoel Tel Aviv	Stadion Graz-Liebenau, Graz
20:30 (CET)	Vastić 14'; Reinmayr 74'; Neukirchner 90'	Report; MatchCentre		Referee: Metin Tokat (Turkey)

2 August 2000	Hapoel Tel Aviv (Israel)	1–2	(Austria) Sturm Graz	Bloomfield Stadium, Tel Aviv
19:00 (CET)	Balili 80'	Report; MatchCentre	Korsós 41'; Kocijan 85'	Referee: Sorin Carpodean (Romania)

==== Third qualifying round ====
8 August 2000	Sturm Graz (Austria)	2–1	(Netherlands) Feyenoord	Stadion Graz-Liebenau, Graz
20:30 (CET)	Schopp 23' (pen.), 90' (pen.)	Report; MatchCentre	Korneev 7'	Referee: Terje Hauge (Norway)

23 August 2000	Feyenoord (Netherlands)	1–1	(Austria) Sturm Graz	De Kuip, Rotterdam
20:00 (CET)	Jochemsen 87'	Report; MatchCentre	Reinmayr 54'	Referee: Victor Esquinas Torres (Spain)

==== Group stage ====
12 September 2000	Rangers (Scotland)	5–0	(Austria) Sturm Graz	Ibrox Stadium, Glasgow
	Mols 9' de Boer 19'; Albertz 29' van Bronckhorst 72'; Dodds 85'	Report MatchCentre		Referee: Lucílio Batista (Portugal)

20 September 2000	Sturm Graz (Austria)	3–0	(Turkey) Galatasaray	Arnold Schwarzenegger Stadium, Graz
	Yuran 32'; Schopp 64'; Schupp 81'	Report MatchCentre		Referee: René Temmink (Netherlands)

27 September 2000	Monaco (France)	5–0	(Austria) Sturm Graz	Stade Louis II, Monaco
	Simone 13', 38', 41'; Farnerud 77'; Nonda 84'	Report MatchCentre Postmatch		Referee: Eric Romain (Belgium)

17 October 2000	Sturm Graz (Austria)	2–0	(France) Monaco	Arnold Schwarzenegger Stadium, Graz
	Schopp 38', 88'	Report MatchCentre		Referee: Graziano Cesari (Italy)

25 October 2000	Sturm Graz (Austria)	2–0	(Scotland) Rangers	Arnold Schwarzenegger Stadium, Graz
	Yuran 20'; Prilasnig 90'	Report MatchCentre		Referee: Antonio López Nieto (Spain)

7 November 2000	Galatasaray (Turkey)	2–2	(Austria) Sturm Graz	Ali Sami Yen Stadium, Istanbul
	Ergün 30' (pen.); Jardel 75'	Report MatchCentre	Yuran 64'; Hakan Ünsal 80' (o.g.)	Referee: Karl-Erik Nilsson (Sweden)

==== Second group stage ====
21 November 2000	Valencia (Spain)	2–0	(Austria) Sturm Graz	Estadio Mestalla, Valencia
20:45	Carew 45'; Juan Sánchez 47'	Report MatchCentre		Referee: Kim Milton Nielsen (Denmark)

6 December 2000	Sturm Graz (Austria)	0–2	(England) Manchester United	Arnold-Schwarzenegger-Stadion, Graz
		Report MatchCentre	Scholes 18'; Giggs 89'	Attendance: 16,500; Referee: Anders Frisk (Sweden)

14 February 2001	Sturm Graz (Austria)	2–0	(Greece) Panathinaikos	Arnold-Schwarzenegger-Stadion, Graz
	Haas 60'; Kocijan 85'	Report MatchCentre		Referee: Ryszard Wójcik (Poland)

20 February 2001	Panathinaikos (Greece)	1–2	(Austria) Sturm Graz	Olympic Stadium, Athens
	Goumas 73'	Report MatchCentre	Schopp 25'; Haas 42'	Attendance: 20,200; Referee: Alain Sars (France)

7 March 2001	Sturm Graz (Austria)	0–5	(Spain) Valencia	Arnold-Schwarzenegger-Stadion, Graz
		Report MatchCentre	Ayala 5'; Carew 50'; Kily González 59'; Diego Alonso 88', 90'	Referee: Stefano Braschi (Italy)

13 March 2001	Manchester United (England)	3–0	(Austria) Sturm Graz	Old Trafford, Manchester
	Butt 5'; Sheringham 20'; Keane 86'	Report MatchCentre		Attendance: 66,404; Referee: Valentin Ivanov (Russia)
