= 2004–05 Austrian Cup =

Tournament details
- Country: Austria

Final positions
- Champions: Austria Vienna
- Runners-up: Rapid Wien

Tournament statistics
- Top goal scorer: Ivica Vastic (4)

The 2004–05 Austrian Cup (German: ÖFB-Cup) was the 71st season of Austria's nationwide football cup competition. It started on September 14, 2004 with the first game of the First Round. The final was held at the Ernst-Happel-Stadion, Vienna on 1 June 2005.

The competition was won by Austria Vienna after beating Rapid Wien 3–1. Austria Vienna qualified for the second qualifying round of the 2005–06 UEFA Cup as cup winners.

== First round ==
Team 1	Score	Team 2
14 September 2004
Parndorf	1–0	Admira
Rapid Wien Am.	2–1	Wacker Tirol
SV Wallern	0–1	Sturm Graz
Austria Vienna Am.	0-1	SV Mattersburg
FC Kärnten Am.	1–2 (a.e.t.)	SC Bregenz
SC Weiz	2–4 (a.e.t.)	Kapfenberger SV
SVG Reichenau/Aldrans	0–5	FC Kärnten
Sankt Andrä	1–0	DSV Leoben
SPG Axams/Götzens	0–2	Austria Lustenau
Kremser SC	2–0	SV Ried
FC Hard	3–7 (a.e.t.)	FC Gratkorn
DSG Union Perg	1–3	SC Rheindorf Altach
SKN St. Pölten	3–0	SV Wörgl
SVA Kindberg	0–3	LASK Linz
LASK Linz Am.	0–0 (a.e.t.) (3–5 p)	SC Untersiebenbrunn
FC Blau-Weiß Linz	3–2	SV Spittal/Drau
Austria Salzburg Am.	5–0	Zell/See
Grazer AK Am.	0–4	TSV Hartberg
SV Haitzendorf	5–0	SV Horn
SV Rohrbach	1–0	USK Anif
SV Stockerau	0–3	SV Hall
ASK Kottingbrunn	4–3	Pasching Am.
ASK Köflach	0–1	Admira Wacker Mödling Am.
15 September 2004
ASK Kohfidisch	1–2	SV Austria Salzburg

== Second round ==
The Bundesliga clubs entered at the Second round, except Rapid Wien, Grazer AK and Pasching who were involved in European competition and given a bye to Round 3. The games were played on September 28 to October 4, 2005.

The match featuring Rapid Wien Am. and SV Mattersburg had to be abandoned at half time due to floodlight failure. It was replayed in full on December 10.

Team 1	Score	Team 2
28 September 2004
Pasching Am.	1–4	Austria Lustenau
Rapid Wien Am.	abd	SV Mattersburg
Sankt Andrä	3–6	Kapfenberger SV
FC Blau-Weiß Linz	2–1	SC Rheindorf Altach
Austria Salzburg Am.	2–0	SC Untersiebenbrunn
ASK Köflach	2–3 (a.e.t.)	FC Kärnten
SV Hall	1–0	TSV Hartberg
SV Rohrbach	1–5	LASK Linz
29 September 2004
SV Haitzendorf	1–2	Austria Salzburg
SKN St. Pölten	2–1	SC Bregenz
Parndorf	0–2	Sturm Graz
5 October 2004
Kremser SC	1–0	FC Gratkorn
10 December 2004
Rapid Wien Am.	1–3	SV Mattersburg

== Third round ==
Team 1	Score	Team 2
15 March 2005
Austria Lustenau	2–2 (a.e.t.) (6–5 p)	Pasching
Kremser SC	1–4	Grazer AK
FC Kärnten	3–0	Kapfenberger SV
FC Blau-Weiß Linz	0–3	SV Mattersburg
Austria Salzburg Am.	0–2	Rapid Wien
16 March 2005
SKN St. Pölten	5–1	SV Austria Salzburg
SV Hall	0–3	LASK Linz
20 April 2005
Sturm Graz	0–0 (a.e.t.) (3–5 p)	Austria Wien

== Quarter-finals ==
12 April 2005	Austria Lustenau	1–3	Grazer AK	Lustenau
18:30	Laschet 45'		Sick 40'; Aufhauser 64'; Kujabi 90+3'	Stadium: Reichshofstadion; Attendance: 2,500; Referee: Bernhard Brugger

12 April 2005	FC Kärnten	3–2	LASK Linz	Klagenfurt
19:00	Kabát 41' (pen.); Stückler 62'; Bubalo 85'		Fellner 27'; Kahraman 39'	Stadium: Wörthersee Stadion; Attendance: 900; Referee: Stefan Meßner

12 April 2005	SV Mattersburg	1–3	Rapid Wien	Mattersburg
19:15	Mörz 53'		Hlinka 10'; Došek 61'; Katzer 69'	Stadium: Pappelstadion; Attendance: 10,000; Referee: Franz Mostböck

27 April 2005	SKN St. Pölten	0–6	Austria Wien	Sankt Pölten
19:30			Vastić 27' (pen.), 69'; Petrouš 47'; Gilewicz 51'; Dosunmu 72'; Kitzbichler 86'	Stadium: Voith-Platz; Attendance: 4,500; Referee: Wolfgang Falb

== Semi-finals ==
17 May 2005	Rapid Wien	4–1	Grazer AK	Vienna
19:15	Hofmann 8', 64'; Martínez 90'; Lawarée 90+4'		Ehmann 74'	Stadium: Gerhard Hanappi Stadium; Attendance: 11,100; Referee: Thomas Steiner

18 May 2005	Austria Wien	3–0	FC Kärnten	Vienna
19:15	Sionko 18'; Vastić 36' (pen.); Rushfeldt 62'			Stadium: Franz Horr Stadium; Attendance: 2,500; Referee: Thomas Gangl

== Final ==
1 June 2005
20:15

Austria Wien	3–1	Rapid Wien
Mila 20'; Vastić 55'; Sionko 65'		Burgstaller 5'

Ernst-Happel-Stadion, Vienna
Attendance: 28,000
Referee: Wolfgang Sowa

== See also ==
- 2004–05 Austrian Football Bundesliga
- 2004–05 Austrian First League
