= Joey Didulica =

Croatian-Australian footballer (born 1977)

Personal information
- Full name: Joseph Anthony Didulica
- Date of birth: 14 October 1977 (age 49)
- Place of birth: Geelong, Victoria, Australia
- Height: 1.91 m (6 ft 3 in)
- Position: Goalkeeper

Youth career
- North Geelong Warriors

Senior career*
Years	Team	Apps	(Gls)
1995–1996	North Geelong Warriors	24	(0)
1996–1999	Melbourne Knights	60	(0)
1999–2003	Ajax	16	(0)
2003–2006	Austria Wien	87	(0)
2006–2011	AZ	30	(0)
Total		244	(0)

International career
1998–2000	Australia U23	16	(0)
2004–2006	Croatia	4	(0)
- * Club domestic league appearances and goals

Joseph Anthony Didulica (Croatian pronunciation: [dǐdulit͡sa]; born 14 October 1977) is a former professional footballer who played as a goalkeeper. Born in Australia, he played for the Croatia national team. On 11 October 2011, he ended his career after ongoing neck and head injuries.

== Club career ==
Didulica was born in Geelong, Victoria, Australia to a Croatian father, Luka, and a Croatian-Australian mother, Mary. He also has an older brother, John and sister, Trish. His father emigrated to Australia from Poličnik, a village in northern Dalmatia, about 10 kilometres outside of Zadar. He spoke Croatian at home and grew up with Croatian culture, having attending a Croatian school and Croatian dances as well as demonstrations during the Croatian War of Independence.

Didulica started to play football in the North Geelong Warriors. In 1996, he moved to the Melbourne Knights, a club whose team primarily consists of Australian Croats, and played for them until 1999. Then he transferred to Ajax, where he spent four years, winning the league (Eredivisie) and Dutch Cup in 2003. Didulica, after performing brilliantly well in the UEFA Champions League, signed a three-year deal with Austria Wien in 2003. In Austria, Didulica would win a Bundesliga title, two Austrian Cups, and one Super Cup, whilst spending three seasons as a regular in goal for Austria Wien.

Didulica returned to the Netherlands to play for AZ after being lured by the great Louis Van Gaal as coach. He made seven Eredivisie appearances with the club, before being forced to take a longer break following a brain concussion he sustained in a league match against PSV Eindhoven in October 2006. after being hit with the ball in his head from a shot by PSV's Australian international Jason Čulina. During his time at AZ, although it was tough with his persistent head injuries, Didulica would win another Dutch (Eredivisie) title and a Dutch Super Cup.

On 24 April 2006, an Austrian court sentenced Didulica to a fine of €60,000 on the count of physical injury resulting from negligence, for slamming Rapid Wien's Axel Lawaree at a Vienna derby in May 2005.

In June 2007, Didulica successfully appealed the decision of the lower court to the High Court of Vienna. The original charges against Didulica were quashed and he was acquitted of everything, the Court ruling Didulica had played the ball, not acted unreasonably and did not intend to cause injury to the opponent.

On 11 October 2011, Didulica announced his retirement from football due to his persistent neck and head injuries.

== International career ==
In 2000, Didulica was selected to the Australian squad for the Sydney Olympics, but had to withdraw due to injury and never received an international cap for the Australian national team at A-level. In 2004, he decided to play for the country of his parents, as Australia had not qualified for a World Cup for around 30 years and he saw more opportunities for success with Croatia, who qualified for both World Cups they entered at the time.

Didulica made his debut for the Croatia national team in a friendly match against Macedonia on 28 April 2004 in Skopje and was subsequently selected to be part of the Croatian team at the Euro 2004 finals, where he served as the second-choice goalkeeper without making an appearance. He was a member of the Croatian team in both the qualifying and finals of the 2006 World Cup, but did not play a single minute during the competitions as Tomislav Butina played eight of ten qualifiers and was replaced in the remaining two qualifiers by Stipe Pletikosa, who also played every minute in all three games at the finals. In more than two years of being part of the Croatia national team, Didulica only made four appearances in friendly matches, against Macedonia, Korea Republic, Hong Kong and Austria. Just a month after the end of the 2006 World Cup, Didulica announced his retirement from international football with an explanation that he wants to concentrate more on his club career.

== Honours ==
Ajax

- Eredivisie: 2001–02
- KNVB Cup: 2001–02

Austria Wien

- Austrian Bundesliga: 2005–06
- Austrian Cup: 2004–05, 2005–06

AZ

- Eredivisie: 2008–09
- Johan Cruyff Shield: 2009
