= Rabiu Afolabi =

Nigerian footballer (born 1980)

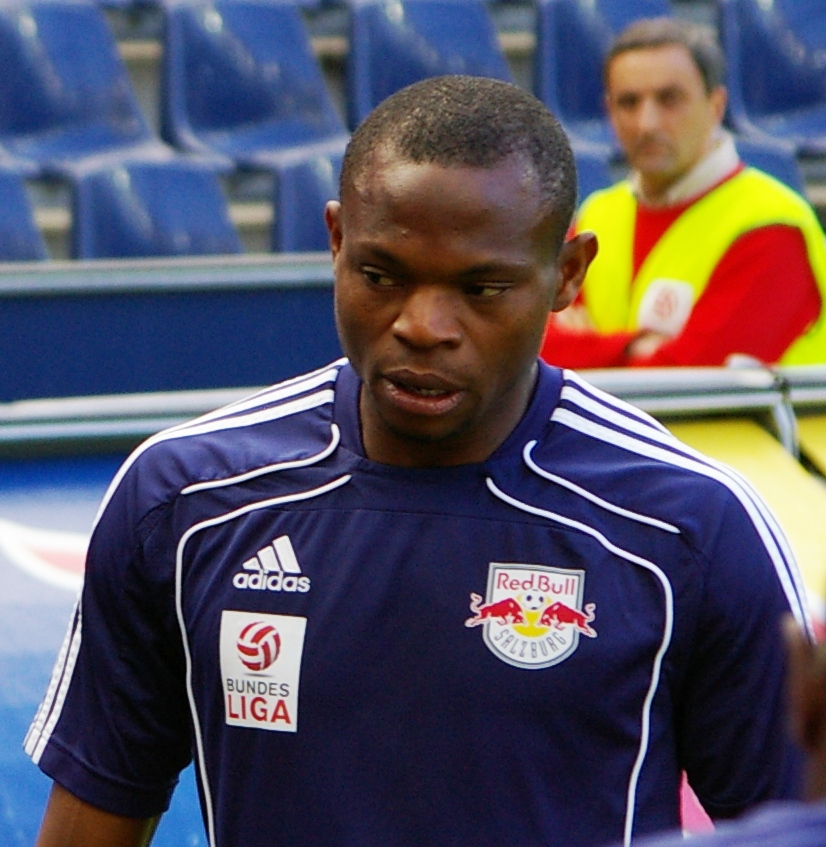
- Afolabi with RB Salzburg in 2011

Personal information
- Date of birth: 18 April 1980 (age 46)
- Place of birth: Osogbo, Nigeria
- Height: 1.84 m (6 ft 0 in)
- Position: Centre-back

Senior career*
Years	Team	Apps	(Gls)
1997	NEPA Lagos		
1997–2003	Standard Liège	89	(2)
2000–2001	→ Napoli (loan)	0	(0)
2003–2005	Austria Wien	60	(1)
2005–2009	Sochaux	123	(5)
2009–2011	Red Bull Salzburg	62	(4)
2011–2012	Monaco	14	(1)
2013	SønderjyskE	5	(0)
Total		353	(13)

International career
2000–2010	Nigeria	20	(1)
- * Club domestic league appearances and goals

Rabiu Afolabi (born 18 April 1980) is a Nigerian former professional footballer, who played as a centre-back.

== Club career ==
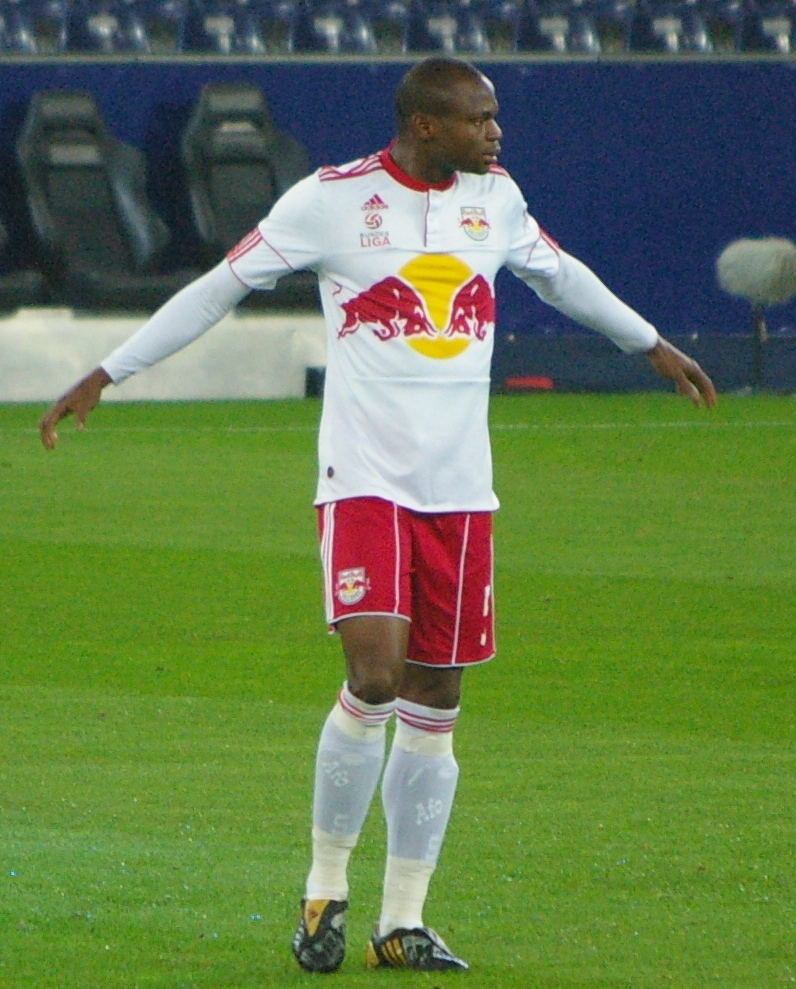
Afolabi in a match against SV Kapfenberg.

Born in Osogbo, Osun State, Nigeria, Afolabi started his football career at NEPA Lagos.

=== Standard Liège and Napoli loan ===
Afolabi soon left his home country by moving to Belgium to Standard Liège after impressing at the 1997 Meridian Cup. Once he made a move to Belgium, Afolabi immediately fell in love with the style of play. In the 1997–98 season, he played in three matches in the Eerste Klasse, of which two in the first team. Standard, however, played a poor season and finished 9th place in the table. In the next season he played in 26 league games, scored a goal and with Liège finishing in sixth place in the league. Standard has also played in the final of Cup of Belgium, losing 3–1 to Lierse In the 1999–2000 season, Standard finished fifth place; Afolabi made 24 appearances scoring 1 goal.

Having become a regular player at Standard Liège, Afolabi signed for Serie A side Napoli on loan ahead of the 2000–01 season. At Napoli, he failed to break into the first team, in part due to injuries. When fit, he played in the club's reserves.

After half a season in Italy, he returned to Liège. After the 2001–02 season he was named the best defender in Belgium, Standard finished fifth. The next season was not as successful: Afolabi played only 14 league matches, Standard completed the season in the 7th position.

=== Austria Wien ===
In 2003, Afolabi decided to move to an Austrian club Austria Wien on a free transfer. He made his debut for the club in the Austrian Supercup, which Wien won 2–1 against FC Kärnten. Five days, he made his league debut for the club, again versus FC Kärnten, in a 2–1 loss. In his first season, Afolabi played a total of 33 matches.

In summer 2004 interest for was reported from Marseille, as well as other clubs. He played in 27 league games in the 2004–05 season, all from the first until the last minute, and scored one goal in a 3–0 win away match against FC Wacker Tirol. Austria finished third place, just behind rival Rapid Wien and Grazer AK.

The following season, Afolabi played in the 2004–05 UEFA Cup tournament with Austria Wien, until the club was eliminated by Italian side Parma. Like last season, the club also won the Austrian Supercup.

=== Sochaux ===
After the 2004–05 season, some Austria Wien players were linked a move away from clubs. Among them was also Afolabi, who joined Sochaux for a €2 million transfer fee. In his Ligue 1 debut on 13 August 2005 he came on as a substitute for youngster Jérémy Ménez. Sochaux won the away match against Nice 2–1 but Afolabi was sent off in the 87th minute of the match. Towards the end of the season, Afolabi scored his first goal, on 6 May 2006, in a draw at home to Troyes. The club finished in 15th place.

Afolabi spent four seasons at Sochaux. In his time there, he earned one title, the 2006–07 Coupe de France. He later stated that winning the cup was the greatest moment of his career.

=== Red Bull Salzburg ===
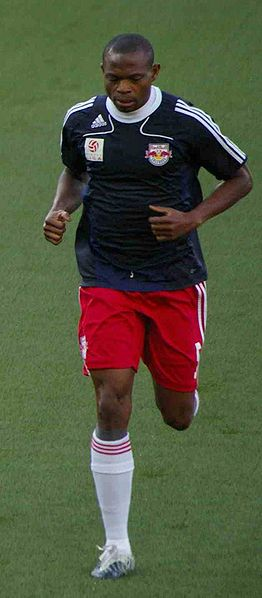
Afolabi in a match during his time at Salzburg

After leaving Sochaux at the end of 2008–09 season as a free agent, Afolabi returned to Austria, signing a two-year contract with Red Bull Salzburg having been previously linked with newly promoted Premier League side Burnley. He became a regular starter in central defence. In February 2010, he scored the winning goal away to title rivals Rapid Wien which helped keep the Red Bulls on course for the championship. Eventually, Red Bull Salzburg would win the title.

On 7 November 2010, he made his 100th Austrian Bundesliga match having made 60 appearances for FK Austria Wien and 40 for Red Bull Salzburg). In December, it was reported that Salzburg were looking to transfer Afolabi in the winter transfer window. After his second season in Salzburg, his contract was not renewed.

=== Monaco ===
Following his release from Salzburg, Afolabi was linked with German side Eintracht Frankfurt but on 31 August 2011, he returned to France joining recently relegated Monaco on a free transfer, agreeing to a two-year contract with the club. On 19 September 2011, he scored his debut goal in a 1–0 victory over against Arles-Avignon. Over time, he featured less and less at Monaco and after one year at the club, it was announced he had left the club by mutual consent with one year of his contract remaining.

=== SønderjyskE and retirement ===
After eight months without a club, Afolabi went on trial at Danish Superliga club SønderjyskE, with a view of earning a contract. On 13 March 2013, he eventually signed with the club for the rest of the 2012–13 season.

On his debut for SønderjyskE, a match against Silkeborg IF on 28 March 2013, Afolabi helped his team to a 5–0 victory over its bottom-table rivals. He was named as one of the best players on the field. Having played three matches he fractured a rib and was substituted during a match against Midtjylland. Afterwards, it was announced he would be out for between three and four weeks. Following his return, he went on to make five appearances in total helping the club survive relegation and finishing in eighth place. At the end of the season, the club remained keen on keeping him by offering him a new contract. However, Afolabi chose to leave the club after three months there.

After leaving Denmark, he announced his retirement and the intent to pursue a career in football management and scouting, having earned a certificate.

== International career ==
Afolabi played a vital role for Nigeria in the 1999 African Youth Championship, coming from defence to score the two goals against Cameroon in the semi-final. Nigeria eventually finished second in the tournament after losing 0–1 to the hosts, Ghana, in the final.

He then captained the Nigerian under-20 team in the 1999 FIFA World Youth Championship in Nigeria.

On 17 June 2000, Afolabi made his full international debut for Nigeria in a 2002 World Cup qualifier against Sierra Leone. He was part of the Nigeria squads at the 2002 and 2010 World Cups.

== Style of play ==
Afolabi is a central defender, who is good aerially and has a thunderous shot. He can play as a fullback or defensive midfielder as well.

== Trivia ==
His name, Afolabi, means "Born into wealth". His nickname in Nigeria is Robocop because of his stiff movements.

In 2011, Afolabi was involved in a charity called "The Rabiu Afolabi Educational Foundation" by setting up a foundation, which he started out with a donation of 50,000 customised books worth about $20,000 to selected public primary and secondary schools in his home state of Oshun State.
