= Daniel Dunst =

Austrian footballer

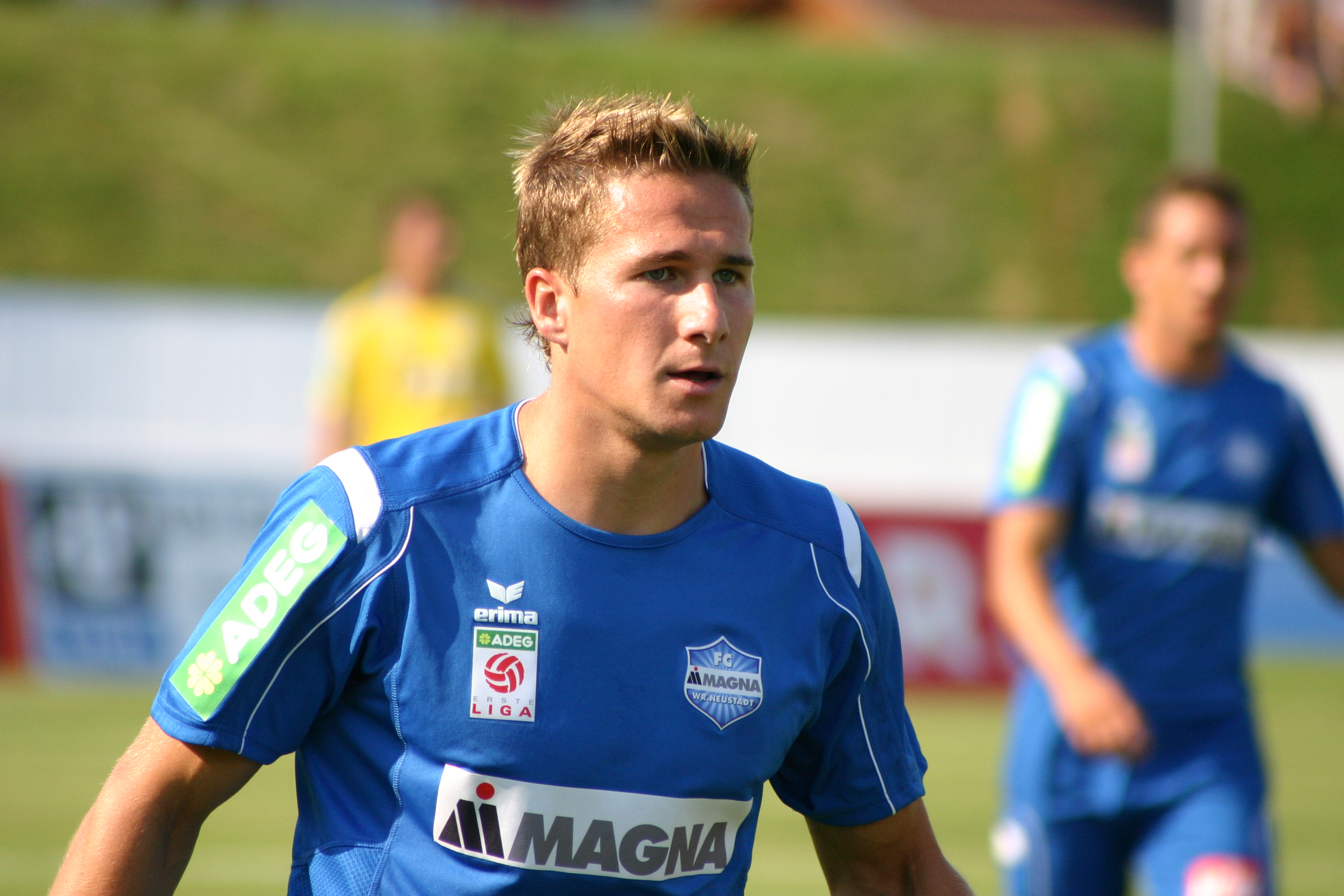

Personal information
- Full name: Daniel Dunst
- Date of birth: 12 April 1984 (age 42)
- Place of birth: Baden bei Wien, Austria
- Height: 1.84 m (6 ft 1/2 in)
- Position: Defender

Youth career
- 1990–1993: 1. SC Pfaffstätten
- 1993–2003: Admira Wacker

Senior career*
| Years | Team | Apps | (Gls) |
| 2003–2006 | Admira Wacker | 9 | (1) |
| 2003–2006 | → Admira Wacker II | 78 | (8) |
| 2006–2007 | First Vienna | 23 | (0) |
| 2007–2008 | SC Austria Lustenau | 28 | (0) |
| 2008–2010 | SC Wiener Neustadt | 51 | (0) |
| 2011 | FC St. Gallen | 11 | (0) |
| 2012–2013 | SC Austria Lustenau | 38 | (0) |
| 2013–2014 | Wolfsberger AC | 2 | (0) |
| 2013–2014 | → Wolfsberger AC II | 6 | (0) |
| 2014–2015 | FCM Traiskirchen | 14 | (0) |
| 2015–2017 | 1. SC Pfaffstätten | | |
| 2017 | SV Sigleß | | |
- * Club domestic league appearances and goals

Daniel Dunst (born 12 April 1984) is a former Austrian footballer who played as a defender.

== Club career ==
Dunst has played for SC Austria Lustenau and SC Wiener Neustadt in the Austrian Football Bundesliga and also Swiss Super League side FC St. Gallen.
