= Tomica Kocijan =

Austrian footballer and manager

Personal information
- Full name: Tomislav Kocijan
- Date of birth: 21 November 1967 (age 58)
- Place of birth: Varaždin, SR Croatia, SFR Yugoslavia
- Height: 1.72 m (5 ft 7 1/2 in)
- Position: Striker

Senior career*
Years	Team	Apps	(Gls)
–1989	NK Varaždin		
1989–1990	Favoritner AC	14	(7)
1990–1994	Vorwärts Steyr	70	(14)
1991–1992	→ Favoritner AC (loan)	24	(3)
1994–1997	Austria Salzburg	96	(13)
1997–2001	Sturm Graz	92	(21)
2001–2002	LASK	28	(9)
2002–2004	TuS Arnfels		
2004–2006	WAC St. Andrä		
2006	Deutschlandsberger SC	13	(3)
2007	ESV St. Michael	11	(11)
2007–2008	SV Leibnitz Flavia Solva	16	(3)

International career
2000–2001	Austria	4	(1)

Managerial career
- 2007–2009: SV Leibnitz Flavia Solva
- 2011: NK Varaždin
- 2013: SV Allerheiligen
- 2014: SV Güssing
- 2016–2021: USV St. Anna/Aigen
- * Club domestic league appearances and goals as of 16:30, 13 December 2008 (UTC)

Tomislav "Tomica" Kocijan (born 21 November 1967, in Varaždin) is a former Austria international football player and current manager.

== Club career ==
He finished his career in the Austrian lower leagues.

== International career ==
He made his debut for Austria in a September 2000 friendly match against Iran and earned a total of 4 caps, scoring 1 goal. His final international was an October 2001 World Cup qualification match away against Israel.
