= Michael Wagner (footballer, born 1975) =

Austrian footballer

Personal information
- Date of birth: 18 December 1975 (age 50)
- Place of birth: Vienna, Austria
- Height: 1.78 m (5 ft 10 in)
- Position: Midfielder

Youth career
- Austria Wien

Senior career*
Years	Team	Apps	(Gls)
1994–1996	Austria Wien	46	(6)
1996–1997	SC Freiburg	16	(0)
1997	Rapid Wien	31	(2)
1998–2005	Austria Wien	182	(34)
2005–2006	Admira Wacker Mödling	26	(2)
2006–2007	SK Schwadorf	35	(6)
Total		336	(50)

International career
2002–2003	Austria	10	(0)
- * Club domestic league appearances and goals

Michael Wagner (born 18 December 1975) is an Austrian former professional footballer who played as a midfielder. He made ten appearances for the Austria national team.

== Career statistics ==
Appearances and goals by national team and year
National team	Year	Apps	Goals
Austria	2002	4	0
Austria	2003	6	0
Total		10	0
