= Florian Sturm =

Austrian footballer

Personal information
- Date of birth: 6 May 1982 (age 44)
- Place of birth: Wörgl, Austria
- Height: 1.79 m (5 ft 10 in)
- Position: Midfielder

Youth career
- Wörgl

Senior career*
Years	Team	Apps	(Gls)
1998–2000	Tirol Innsbruck	6	(0)
2001	WSG Wattens	11	(2)
2001–2002	SW Bregenz	30	(5)
2002–2005	Rapid Wien	49	(2)
2005	Greuther Fürth	3	(0)
2006	Wacker Tirol	6	(1)
2006–2008	FC Vaduz	51	(14)
2008–2009	Milton Keynes Dons	5	(0)
2009–2010	SV Ried	18	(3)
2010–2011	FC Vaduz	12	(0)
2012–2012	First Vienna	10	(0)
2012-2013	SV Wörgl	7	(1)

International career
2002–2003	Austria U-21	7	(1)
- * Club domestic league appearances and goals

Florian Sturm (born 6 May 1982) is an Austrian former professional footballer who played as a midfielder.

== Career ==
Sturm was born in Wörgl, Tyrol. He started his career at Tirol and went to WSG Wattens of 1st League for their campaign to avoid relegation. He played one season at SW Bregenz before joining Rapid Wien. He signed a contract extension until summer 2005 in April 2004.

In the summer of 2008 Sturm played on trial for Milton Keynes Dons, scoring a goal in a 4–1 friendly defeat to Sheffield Wednesday He signed on a free transfer becoming Roberto Di Matteo's first signing. However, after several months plagued by injury and only a handful of league games, his contract was mutually terminated.

== Honours ==
- Austrian Football Bundesliga: 2005
