= Christoph Jank =

Austrian footballer and manager

Personal information
- Date of birth: 14 October 1973 (age 53)
- Place of birth: Zwettl, Austria
- Height: 1.82 m (6 ft 0 in)
- Position: Defender

Senior career*
Years	Team	Apps	(Gls)
1995–1998	First Vienna FC	18	(0)
1995	→ ASK Klingenbach (loan)		
1998–1999	SK Vorwärts Steyr	20	(0)
1999–2006	SV Austria Salzburg	210	(3)
2006–2008	SV Ried	69	(0)
2008–2011	SC-ESV Parndorf 1919	79	(10)
2011–2012	FAC Team für Wien	30	(0)
2012–2013	FV Austria XIII		

Managerial career
- 2017: Wiener Sport-Club
- * Club domestic league appearances and goals

Christoph Jank (born 14 October 1973 in Zwettl) is an Austrian football player and manager.
