= Mario Kienzl =

Austrian footballer

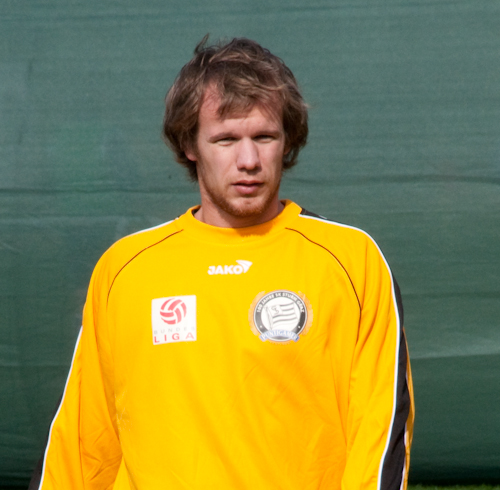

Personal information
- Date of birth: 19 December 1983 (age 42)
- Place of birth: Feldkirch, Austria
- Height: 1.78 m (5 ft 10 in)
- Position: Midfielder

Youth career
- LUV Graz
- SK Sturm Graz

Senior career*
Years	Team	Apps	(Gls)
2001–2011	Sturm Graz	132	(8)
2011–2012	FC Vaduz	12	(0)

International career
2009	Austria	1	(0)
- * Club domestic league appearances and goals as of 13 July 2012

Mario Kienzl (born 19 December 1983 in Feldkirch) is an Austrian professional footballer. He last played for FC Vaduz in Liechtenstein.
