= Alexander Knezevic =

Austrian footballer (born 1981)

Alexander Knezevic (born 14 October 1981) is an Austrian footballer who played as a goalkeeper.

== Early life ==
Knezevic was born in 1981 in Austria. He joined the youth academy of Austrian side Sturm Graz at the age of fourteen.

== Career ==
Knezevic started his senior career with Austrian side Sturm Graz. He helped the club win the league. He debuted for the club at the age of 16. He almost signed for Austrian side Kapfenberg. He retired from professional football due to injury.

== Personal life ==
Knezevic is a native of Graz, Austria. He has four sons.
