= Ernst Dospel =

Austrian football player

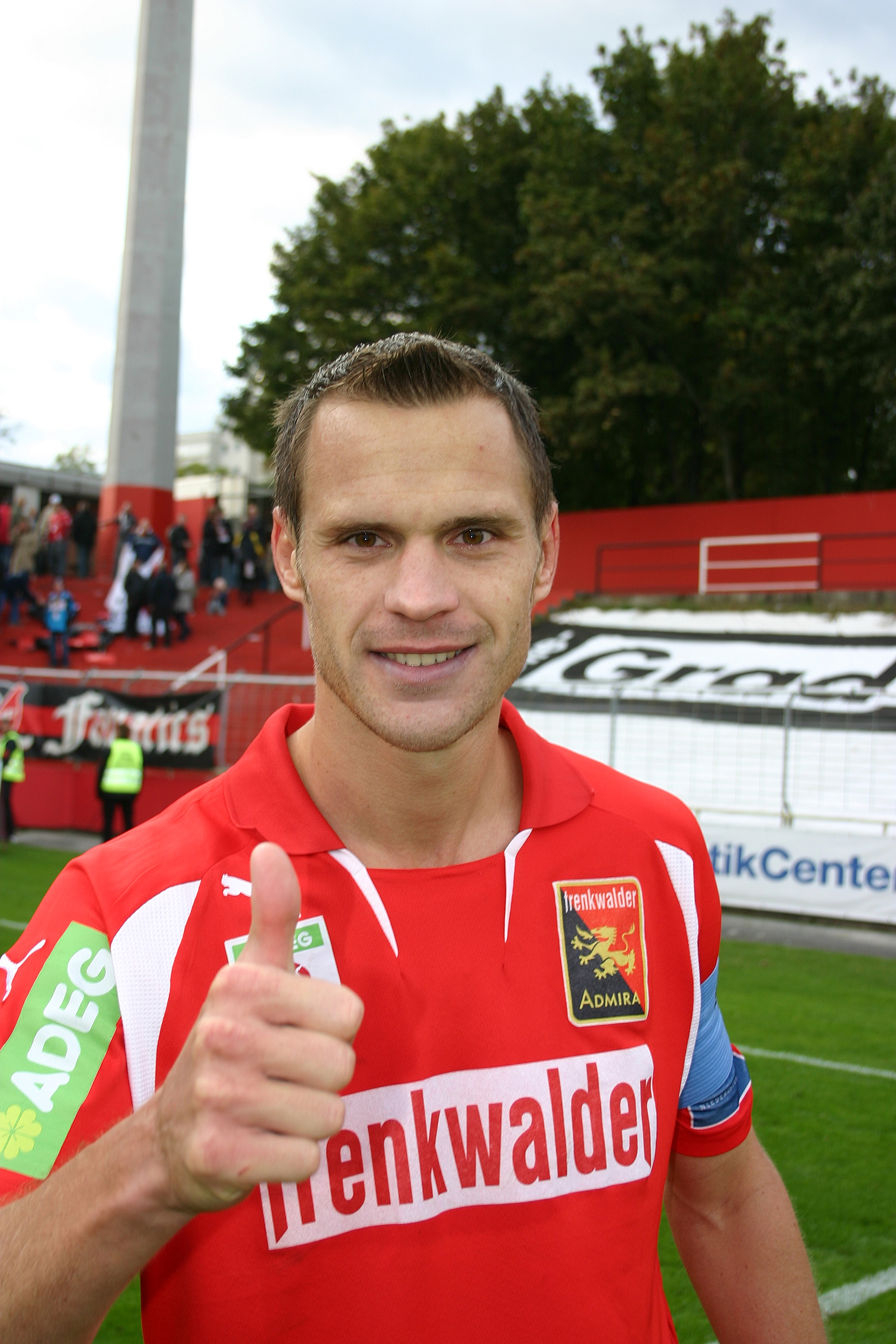

Personal information
- Full name: Ernst Dospel
- Date of birth: 8 October 1976 (age 50)
- Place of birth: Absdorf, Austria
- Height: 1.85 m (6 ft 1 in)
- Position: Defender

Team information
- Current team: First Vienna FC
- Number: 4

Youth career
- SV Absdorf
- 1990–1995: SV Prater Memphis

Senior career*
Years	Team	Apps	(Gls)
1995–2006	Austria Wien	288	(8)
2006	Sturm Graz	13	(1)
2007	SV Pasching	13	(0)
2007–2008	SV Ried	30	(2)
2008–2010	VfB Admira Wacker Mödling	56	(4)
2010	SV Absdorf	12	(4)
2011–2013	First Vienna FC	53	(0)

International career^{‡}
1996–1997	Austria under-21	10	(0)
2000–2005	Austria	19	(0)
- * Club domestic league appearances and goals as of 18:22, 20 September 2013 (UTC) ‡ National team caps and goals as of 18:22, 20 September 2013 (UTC)

Ernst Dospel (born 8 October 1976 in Absdorf) is an Austrian football player who currently plays for Austrian non-league team SV Haitzendorf.

== Club career ==
Dospel started his professional career at Austria Wien where he claimed a regular starting place for over 10 seasons. In summer 2006 he signed a half-year contract with Sturm Graz only to move on to SV Pasching for the remainder of the 2006/2007 season. After a year at SV Ried he joined VfB Admira Wacker Mödling in summer 2008.

== International career ==
He made his debut for Austria in a March 2000 friendly match against Sweden and went on to earn 19 caps, scoring no goals. His last international was an April 2005 friendly match against Scotland.

== National team statistics ==
Austria national team
Year	Apps	Goals
2000	1	0
2001	0	0
2002	6	0
2003	7	0
2004	2	0
2005	3	0
Total	19	0

== Honours ==
- Austrian Football Bundesliga (2):
  - 2003, 2006
- Austrian Cup (3):
  - 2003, 2005, 2006
