= Petr Voříšek =

Czech footballer (born 1979)

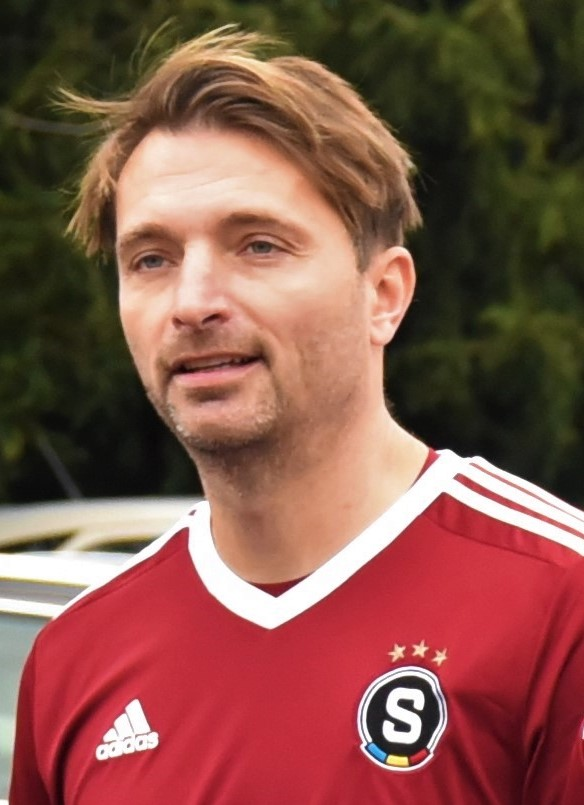
- Voříšek in 2021

Personal information
- Date of birth: 19 March 1979 (age 47)
- Place of birth: Děčín, Czechoslovakia
- Height: 1.85 m (6 ft 1 in)
- Position: Midfielder

Team information
- Current team: FK Junior Děčín

Youth career
- 1985–1988: Lokomotiva Děčín
- 1988–1992: Kovostroj Děčín
- 1992–1996: Pelikán Děčín
- 1996–1999: FK Teplice

Senior career*
| Years | Team | Apps | (Gls) |
| 1997–2003 | FK Teplice | 102 | (6) |
| 1999–2000 | → FK Chomutov (loan) | 9 | (1) |
| 2004–2005 | Sparta Prague | 29 | (1) |
| 2005–2006 | Austria Kärnten | 31 | (3) |
| 2006–2007 | Rapid Wien | 31 | (4) |
| 2007–2007 | Mladá Boleslav | 14 | (0) |
| 2008–2008 | Sparta Prague | 29 | (1) |
| 2009 | SCR Altach | 14 | (5) |
| 2009–2011 | Austria Wien | 28 | (1) |
| 2011–2012 | SCR Altach | 25 | (4) |
| 2012–2016 | SV Wallern | 14 | (0) |
| 2016–2019 | SV Gmunden | | |
| 2019 | Union Michaelnbach | 11 | (1) |
| 2020– | FK Junior Děčín | | |

International career
| 2002 | Czech Republic U-21 | 20 | (1) |
| 2003–2004 | Czech Republic | 4 | (0) |

Managerial career
- 2015–2016: SV Wallern (player-manager)
- 2018: SV Gmunden (player-manager)
Medal record
Men's football
Representing Czech Republic
UEFA European Under-21 Championship
| Winner | 2002 Switzerland |
- * Club domestic league appearances and goals as of 26 October 2020

Petr Voříšek (born 19 March 1979) is a Czech retired footballer who played as a defender or midfielder.

He spent most of his career in FK Teplice, AC Sparta Prague and various clubs in the Austrian Football Bundesliga. He has played for the Czech Republic national football team (4 times). Voříšek was also part of the Czech side which won the UEFA U-21 Championships in 2002.

== Career ==
=== Later career ===
After a year at SC Altach, Voříšek moved to the Regionalliga Mitte for SV Wallern. He spent four years there, with the best performance in 2013/2014 with a fourth place in the table. He was also appointed player-manager for the 2015–16 season.

For the 2016/2017 season he moved to the Upper Austrian League club SV Gmunden. In April 2018, he was appointed interim manager for Gmunden. The club announced in July 2018, that he would continue in his position as a player-manager. However, he was replaced as manager at the end of 2018 but continued to play for the team

He played for Gmunden until the summer 2019, before joining Union Michaelnbach. However, the club reported in the winter 2020, that he had returned to the Czech Republic. Voříšek returned to his hometown, Děčín, where he joined FK Junior Děčín.
