= Richard Kitzbichler =

Austrian footballer

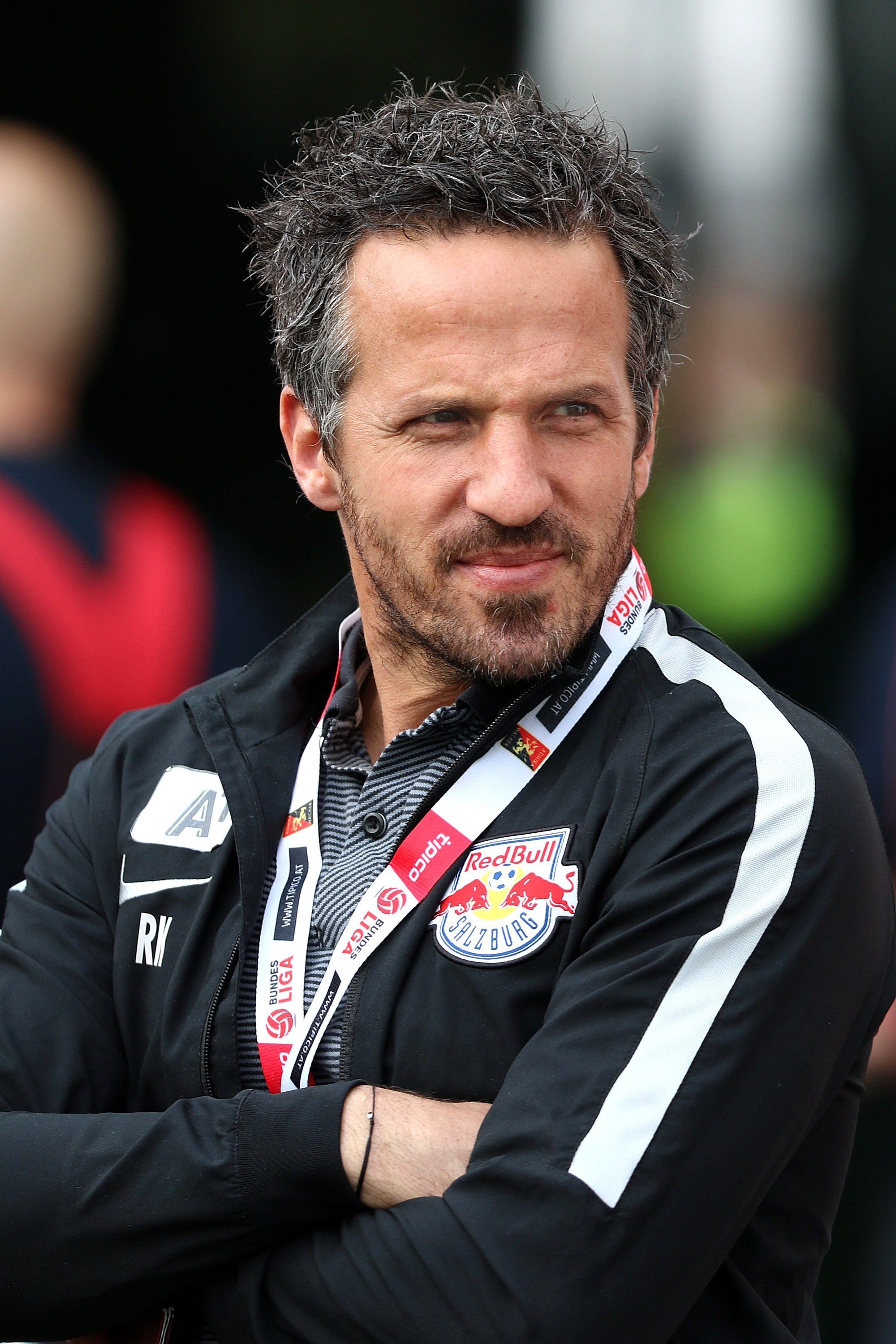
- Kitzbichler in 2017

Personal information
- Date of birth: 12 January 1974 (age 52)
- Place of birth: Wörgl, Austria
- Height: 1.74 m (5 ft 9 in)
- Position: Midfielder

Youth career
- SV Niederndorf
- BNZ Tirol

Senior career*
Years	Team	Apps	(Gls)
1992–1993	Wacker Innsbruck	1	(0)
1993–1997	Tirol Innsbruck	71	(14)
1994–1995	→ SC Holz Pfeifer Kundl (loan)	32	(15)
1997–2002	Austria Salzburg	162	(27)
2002–2003	Hamburger SV	7	(0)
2003–2005	Austria Wien	45	(3)
2005–2006	Melbourne Victory	18	(5)
2006–2009	Red Bull Salzburg II	59	(15)
Total		398	(79)

International career
1996–2002	Austria	17	(0)

Managerial career
- 2009–2015: Red Bull Salzburg (video analyst)
- 2015–2017: Red Bull Salzburg (assistant)
- 2017–2019: Beijing Sinobo Guoan (assistant)
- 2019–2022: Southampton (assistant)
- * Club domestic league appearances and goals

Richard Kitzbichler (born 12 January 1974) is an Austrian former professional footballer who played as a midfielder.

== Club career ==
Kitzbichler was born in Wörgl, Tyrol. He started his career in 1992 with FC Wacker Innsbruck in the Austrian Bundesliga. In 1997, he signed a contract with SV Austria Salzburg and stayed there until 2002. He spent one season with Hamburger SV in the German Bundesliga, and then returned to Austria. From 2003 he played for FK Austria Wien, until 2005 when he joined Australian A-League club Melbourne Victory. After a highly successful 2005, the popular Kitzbichler agreed to return to the club he left in 2002 to take up a playing and coaching role. In January 2006, Kitzbichler accepted a transfer back to his former club of Salzburg (now known as Red Bull Salzburg due to a corporate takeover), thus ending his time as one of the pioneering members of the new Melbourne football club. He helped Red Bull Salzburg's amateur side, Red Bull Salzburg II, achieve promotion from the Austrian Regionalliga West to the Second Division of the Bundesliga. He retired from active football in May 2009.

== International career ==
Kitzbichler made his debut for Austria in April 1996 against Hungary but was ignored for the 1998 FIFA World Cup. He earned 17 caps, no goals scored. His last international was a May 2002 friendly match against Germany.

== Coaching career ==
Kitzbichler was member of the coaching staff of FC Red Bull Salzburg where he worked as video analyst, and for a couple of month as assistant coach.

In 2017, Roger Schmidt brought Kitzbichler to Beijing.

In August 2019, he was announced as first team assistant coach of Premier League club Southampton, working alongside Ralph Hasenhüttl. On 7 November 2022, Kitzbichler departed the club alongside Hasenhüttl.

On 4 September 2023, he joined Bayern Munich's sporting department.

== Career statistics ==
Appearances and goals by national team and year
National team	Year	Apps	Goals
Austria	1996	1	0
Austria	1997	0	0
Austria	1998	0	0
Austria	1999	1	0
Austria	2000	3	0
Austria	2001	8	0
Austria	2002	4	0
Total		17	0

== Honours ==
Austria Wien

- Austrian Cup: 2004–05
- Austrian Supercup: 2004

Austria Salzburg

- Austrian Supercup: 1997
