= Muhammet Akagündüz =

Turkish-born Austrian footballer

Muhammet Hanifi Akagündüz
Personal information
- Full name: Muhammet Hanifi Akagündüz
- Date of birth: January 11, 1978 (age 48)
- Place of birth: Bingöl, Turkey
- Height: 1.72 m (5 ft 8 in)
- Position: Striker

Youth career
- 1994–1996: WS Ottakring
- 1996–1997: Breitensee WAT

Senior career*
Years	Team	Apps	(Gls)
1997–1998	Austria Wien Amateure	0	(0)
1998	SV Gerasdorf	0	(0)
1998	FCN Skt Pölten	0	(0)
1998	Austria Wien	0	(0)
1998–1999	FCN Skt Pölten	34	(11)
1999–2000	VfB Admira Wacker Mödling	0	(0)
2000–2003	SV Ried	90	(29)
2003–2004	Malatyaspor	29	(6)
2004–2005	Konyaspor	31	(6)
2005–2006	Rapid Wien	34	(9)
2006	Kayserispor	13	(2)
2007	Hellas Verona	5	(2)
2007–2008	SV Ried	27	(4)
2008–2009	Manisaspor	27	(8)
2009–2010	Admira Wacker Mödling	13	(5)

International career^{‡}
2002–2007	Austria	10	(1)
- * Club domestic league appearances and goals as of end of 2009/10 season ‡ National team caps and goals as of 15 June 2008

Muhammet Hanifi Akagündüz (born January 11, 1978, in Bingöl), nicknamed Aka, is a Turkish-born Austrian footballer.

Akagündüz moved with his family to Austria in 1987 and he naturalised three years later.

== Club career ==
He played for 11 clubs total: FK Austria Wien, SV Gerasdorf, St. Pölten, VfB Admira Wacker Mödling, SV Ried, Malatyaspor, Konyaspor, Rapid Wien, Kayserispor and Hellas Verona.

== International career ==
Internationally, Akagündüz has only represented the Austria national football team, having decided to play for his naturalised country rather than that of his birth. He made his debut for Austria in October 2002 against Belarus and has earned 10 caps, scoring one goal. His final international game was a February 2007 friendly match against Malta in which he came on as a late substitute for Roland Linz.

== National team statistics ==
Austria national team
Year	Apps	Goals
2002	3	1
2003	0	0
2004	0	0
2005	1	0
2006	5	0
2007	1	0
Total	10	1

=== International goal ===
Scores and results list Austria's goal tally first.

#	Date	Venue	Opponent	Score	Result	Competition
1.	12 October 2002	Dinamo Stadium, Minsk	Belarus	2–0	2–0	UEFA Euro 2004 qualification
