= Markus Kiesenebner =

Austrian footballer (born 1979)

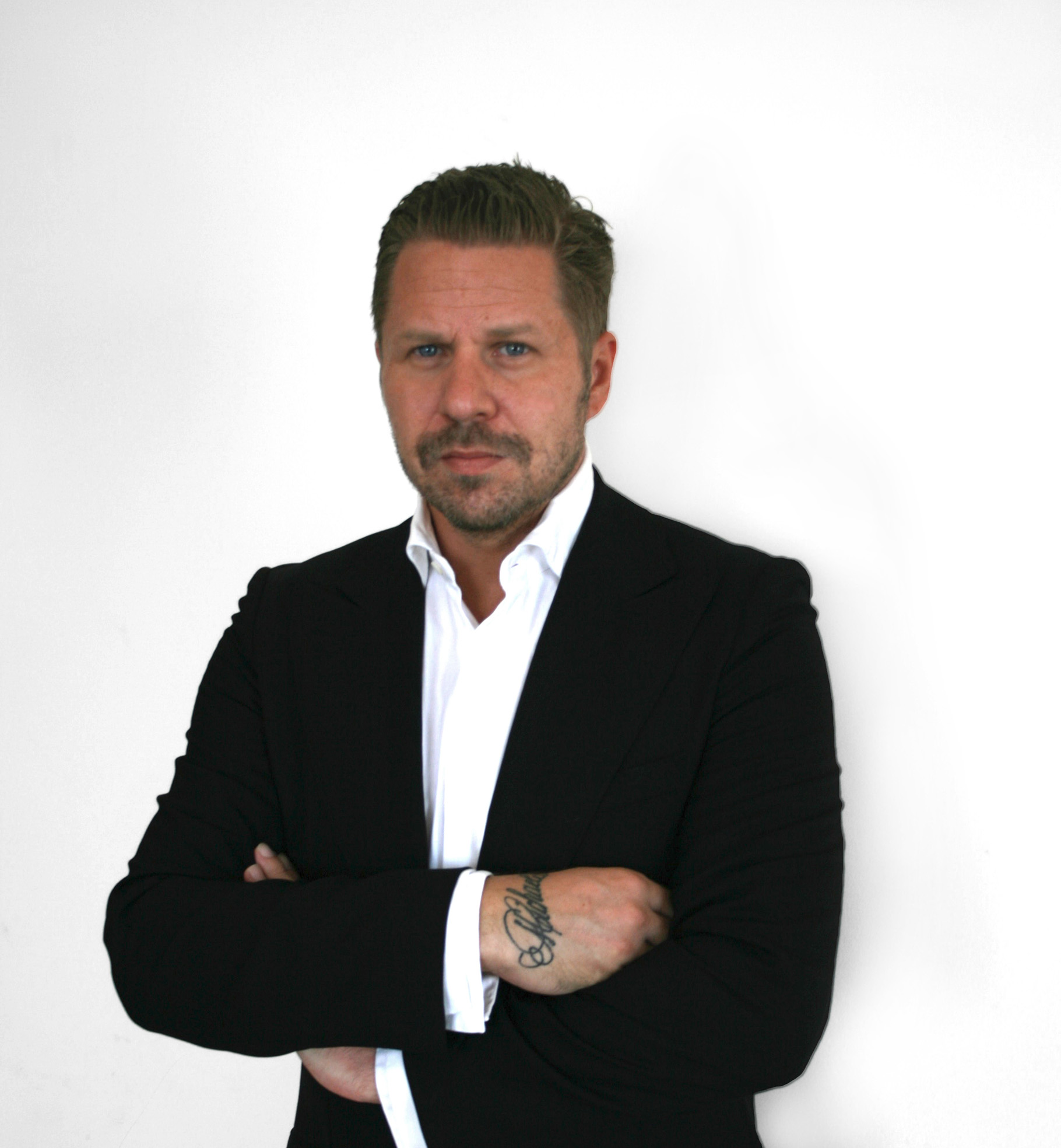

Personal information
- Date of birth: 21 April 1979 (age 47)
- Place of birth: Linz, Austria
- Position: Defensive midfielder

Youth career
- USW Babenberg

Senior career*
Years	Team	Apps	(Gls)
1996–1997	FC Linz		
1997–2001	LASK Linz	40	(2)
2001–2002	Austria Wien	31	(1)
2002–2004	SV Pasching	48	(6)
2004–2007	Austria Wien	125	(22)
2007–2008	Lillestrøm SK	6	(0)
2009	SC Rheindorf Altach		
2009–	FC Pasching		

International career^{‡}
2004–2007	Austria	12	(1)
- * Club domestic league appearances and goals as of 20 January 2008 ‡ National team caps and goals as of 20 July 2008

Markus Kiesenebner (born 21 April 1979) is an Austrian former footballer who played as a defensive midfielder. He retired from active career in 2009 because of a serious knee injury. Since 2009 he is founder and chairman of MKI International Holding, Director of MK&P and Member of the Board of Austria Independent Group of Companies.

== Club career ==
Markus Kiesenebner was born in Linz, started his career with hometown FC Linz, then he played for LASK Linz and when the two Linz sides merged under the LASK name, he moved to Austria Wien in 2001.

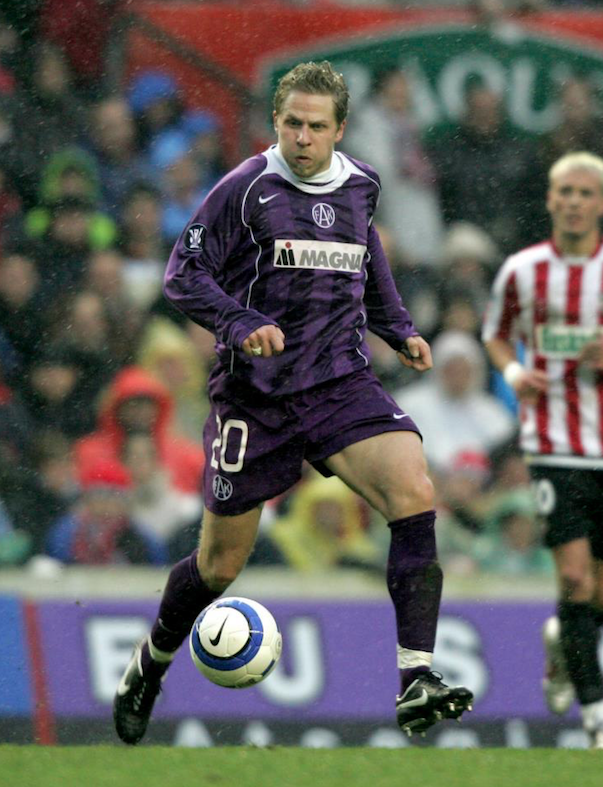
Markus Kiesenebner – UEFA Cup 2004/2005 – Athletic Bilbao

In 2002-03 he returned to Upper Austria to the 1st League Champions SV Pasching by loan and in his two seasons at the Waldstadion he helped Pasching qualify for the UEFA Cup for the first time. Also in the UI-Cup competition they were very successful. With a 4:0 win at their home ground and the 1:1 in Bremen they reached the UI-Cup Final against FC Schalke 04. Markus Kiesenebner scored the goal against Werder Bremen (1:1)

This prompted renewed interest from Austria Wien and they cancelled the loan contract and ordered him back. Markus Kiesenebner played for Austria Wien as defensive midfielder, was at this time in 2006 Austrian Champions and ÖFB Cup winner. International, in 2004/05 he played with Austria Wien in the UEFA Cup group stage and played against Dnipro Dnipropetrovsk, Real Zaragoza, Club Brugge and Utrecht. Austria Wien reached the UEFA – Cup quarter finals with fantastic wins over Athletic Bilbao and Real Zaragoza but failed against FC Parma to go the next step to the semi-finals against CSKA Moscow. (UEFA Cup Winner 2004–2005)

On 1 June 2007, Kiesenebner signed for Norwegian Premier League club Lillestrøm SK, in a Bosman ruling. After his move to Lillestrøm, Kiesenebner has been severely troubled by injuries. He is estimated to be back to full fitness in April 2008. After yet a season troubled with injury in 2008, with little or no playing time at all, Kiesenebner and Lillestrøm came to an agreement to terminate the contract in November 2008. After two months without club he signed with SC Rheindorf Altach in January 2009.

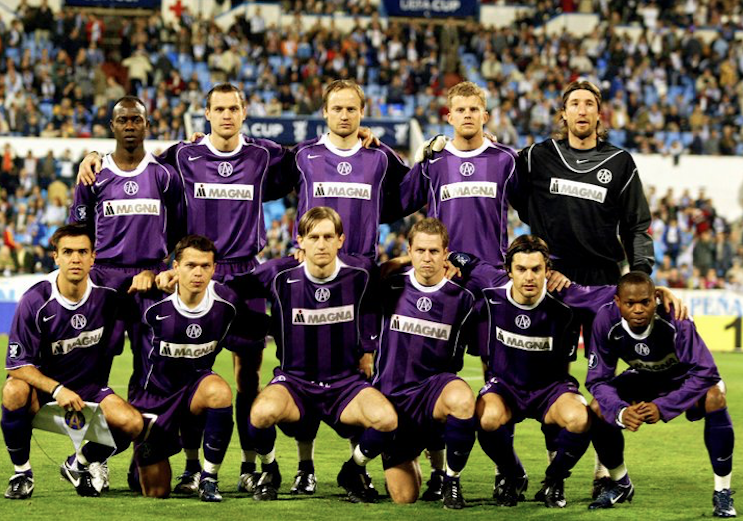
European UEFA Cup 2004/2005

== International career ==
Markus Kiesenebner played 16 times for the Austrian U16 national team and scored 3 goals, 22 caps for the Austrian U18 national team with 1 goal and 21 times for the Austrian U21 national team and he scored 3 times. He made his debut for Austria in an April 2004 friendly match against Luxembourg and has earned 12 caps, scoring one goal.

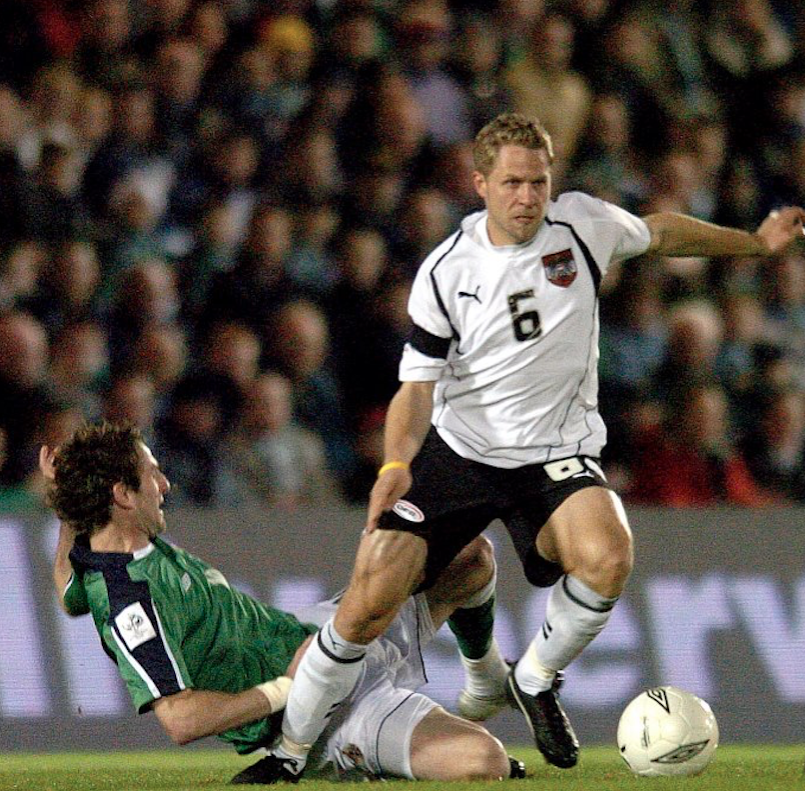
Austrian Nationalteam (Markus Kiesenebner 2004)

=== International goals ===
Scores and results list Luxembourg's goal tally first.

No	Date	Venue	Opponent	Score	Result	Competition
1.	28 April 2004	Tivoli-Neu, Innsbruck, Austria	Luxembourg	2–0	4–1	Friendly

== Honours ==
- Austrian Football Bundesliga (1):
  - 2006
- Austrian Cup (3):
  - 2005, 2006, 2007
- Norwegian Cup (1):
  - 2007
- Austrian Supercup (1):
  - 2005

== Business ==
Established in 2009, Markus Kiesenebner is founder and chairman of MKI International Holding. MKI International Holding is a global operating company based in the United Arab Emirates. MKI develops and manages an extensive portfolio of companies focused on sports management, sports projects, real estate, financial instruments, project investments, air transportation, hospitality, artworks,... Markus Kiesenebner is also Member of the Board of the Private Network – Austria Independent Group. In 2013 Markus Kiesenebner founded also his own Brand with the name MK21.

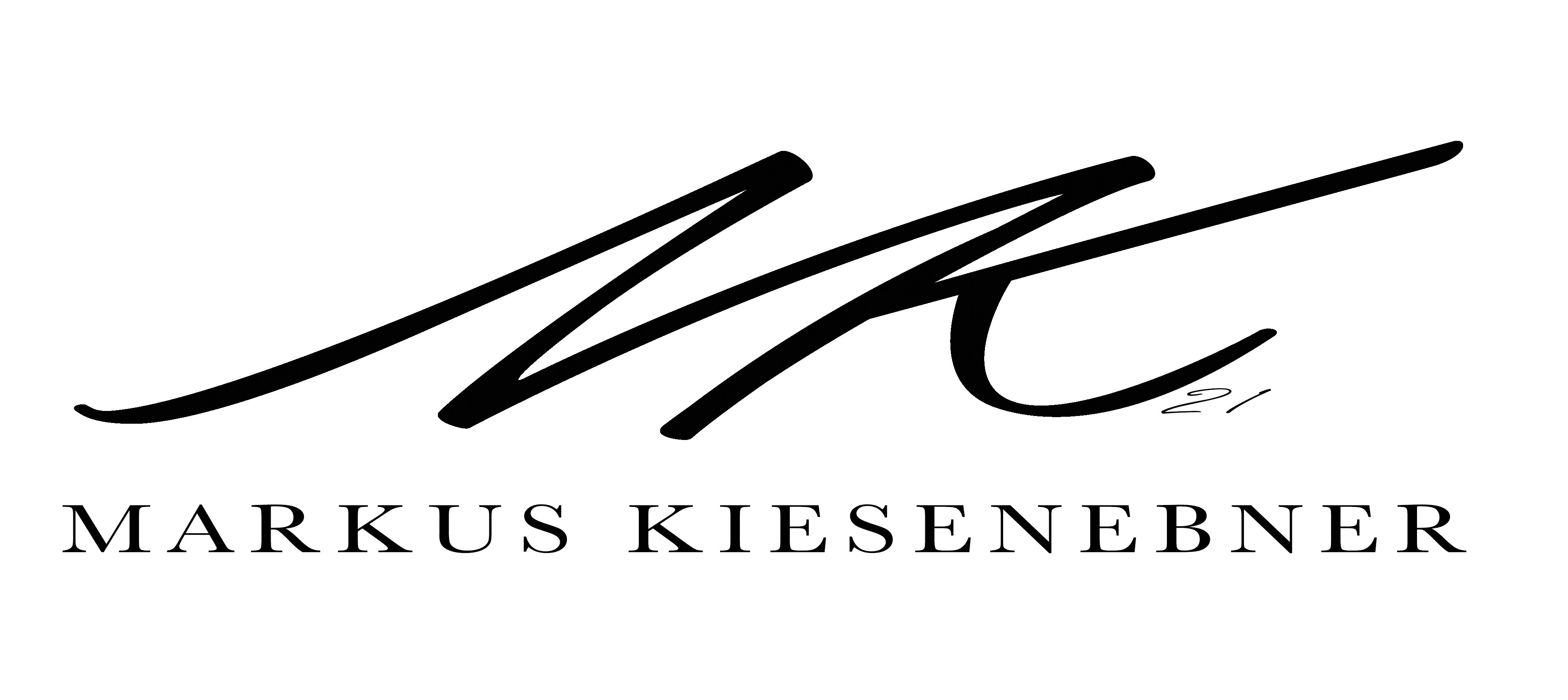
MK21 by Markus Kiesenebner
