= Tosin Dosunmu =

Nigerian footballer

Personal information
- Date of birth: 15 July 1980 (age 46)
- Place of birth: Lagos, Nigeria
- Height: 1.78 m (5 ft 10 in)
- Position: Striker

Senior career*
Years	Team	Apps	(Gls)
1997–1998	First Bank		
1998–2001	Molenbeek	55	(11)
2001–2002	Dender	28	(23)
2002	Mechelen	11	(4)
2003–2004	Westerlo	66	(32)
2004–2005	Austria Wien	23	(4)
2005–2006	Germinal Beerschot	31	(18)
2006–2007	Nancy	11	(1)
2007	→ Zulte Waregem (loan)	16	(2)
2007–2011	Germinal Beerschot	92	(16)
2011	→ MVV (loan)	12	(3)
2011–2012	Royal Antwerp	20	(3)
2012–2013	Sint-Niklaas	6	(1)

International career
2004	Nigeria	1	(0)
- * Club domestic league appearances and goals

Tosin Dosunmu(born 15 July 1980) is a Nigerian former professional footballer who played as a striker.

== Club career ==
Dosunmu played for AS Nancy, KV Mechelen, K.V.C. Westerlo and Austria Wien. In the 2005–06 season, while he played for Beerschot, Dosunmu became top scorer in the Belgian First Division with 18 goals. His nickname is Cheadle due to his resemblance to the actor Don Cheadle.

== International career ==
Dosunmu represented the Nigeria national team twice internationally.
