= Jozef Valachovič =

Slovak footballer and manager

Personal information
- Full name: Jozef Valachovič
- Date of birth: 12 July 1975 (age 51)
- Place of birth: Bratislava, Czechoslovakia
- Height: 1.89 m (6 ft 2 in)
- Position: Defender

Senior career*
Years	Team	Apps	(Gls)
1993–1996	Inter Bratislava	13	(0)
1996–1997	ŠKP Devín	-	
1997–2000	Ozeta Dukla Trenčín	77	(15)
2000	Maccabi Tel Aviv	15	(0)
2000–2004	FC Slovan Liberec	46	(2)
2004–2007	SK Rapid Wien	71	(7)
2007–2008	SK Schwadorf	29	(3)
2008–2009	ŠK Slovan Bratislava	29	(5)
2010–2012	FK Hainburg		

International career
1999–2009	Slovakia	33	(1)

Managerial career
- 2010–2012: FK Hainburg (playing coach)
- 2012–2014: 1. FK Příbram (assistant)
- 2014: FC Slovan Liberec (assistant)
- 2021: 1. FK Příbram
- * Club domestic league appearances and goals

Jozef Valachovič (born 12 July 1975) is former Slovak international footballer and later football manager. He played 33 matches for the Slovak national football team.

On 15 March 2021 Valachovič became manager of Czech First League club 1. FK Příbram.
