= György Korsós =

Hungarian footballer (born 1976)

Personal information
- Date of birth: 22 August 1976 (age 50)
- Place of birth: Győr, Hungary
- Height: 1.82 m (5 ft 11 1/2 in)
- Position: Centre back

Senior career*
Years	Team	Apps	(Gls)
1993–1999	Győri ETO FC	128	(17)
1999–2004	Sturm Graz	134	(12)
2004–2006	Rapid Wien	53	(2)
2006–2007	Skoda Xanthi	6	(0)
2008–2009	Austria Wien (A)	30	(4)
2010	Stegersbach	15	(0)
Total		366	(35)

International career
1996–1997	Hungary U21	3	(0)
1998–2005	Hungary	33	(1)
- * Club domestic league appearances and goals

György Korsós (born 22 August 1976) is a former Hungarian footballer who played as a central defender or defensive midfielder.

He made his debut for the Hungary national team in 1998, and got 33 caps and 1 goal until 2005. He has played in a total of 21 champions League games.

== Career statistics ==
=== International ===
Appearances and goals by national team and year
National team	Year	Apps	Goals
Hungary	1998	4	1
Hungary	1999	10	0
Hungary	2000	7	0
Hungary	2001	8	0
Hungary	2002	–	
Hungary	2003	–	
Hungary	2004	–	
Hungary	2005	4	0
Total		33	1

Scores and results list Hungary's goal tally first, score column indicates score after each Korsós goal.

List of international goals scored by György Korsós
No.	Date	Venue	Opponent	Score	Result	Competition
1	18 November 1998	Üllői úti Stadion, Budapest, Hungary	Switzerland	1–0	2–0	Friendly

== Honours ==
- With Sturm Graz
  - Austrian Bundesliga: Runners-up 2000 & 2002
  - ÖFB-Cup: Runner-up 2002
  - Austrian Supercup: Runner-up 2002
- With Rapid Wien:
  - Austrian Bundesliga: 2005
