= Sebastián Martínez (footballer, born 1977) =

Austrian-Uruguayan footballer

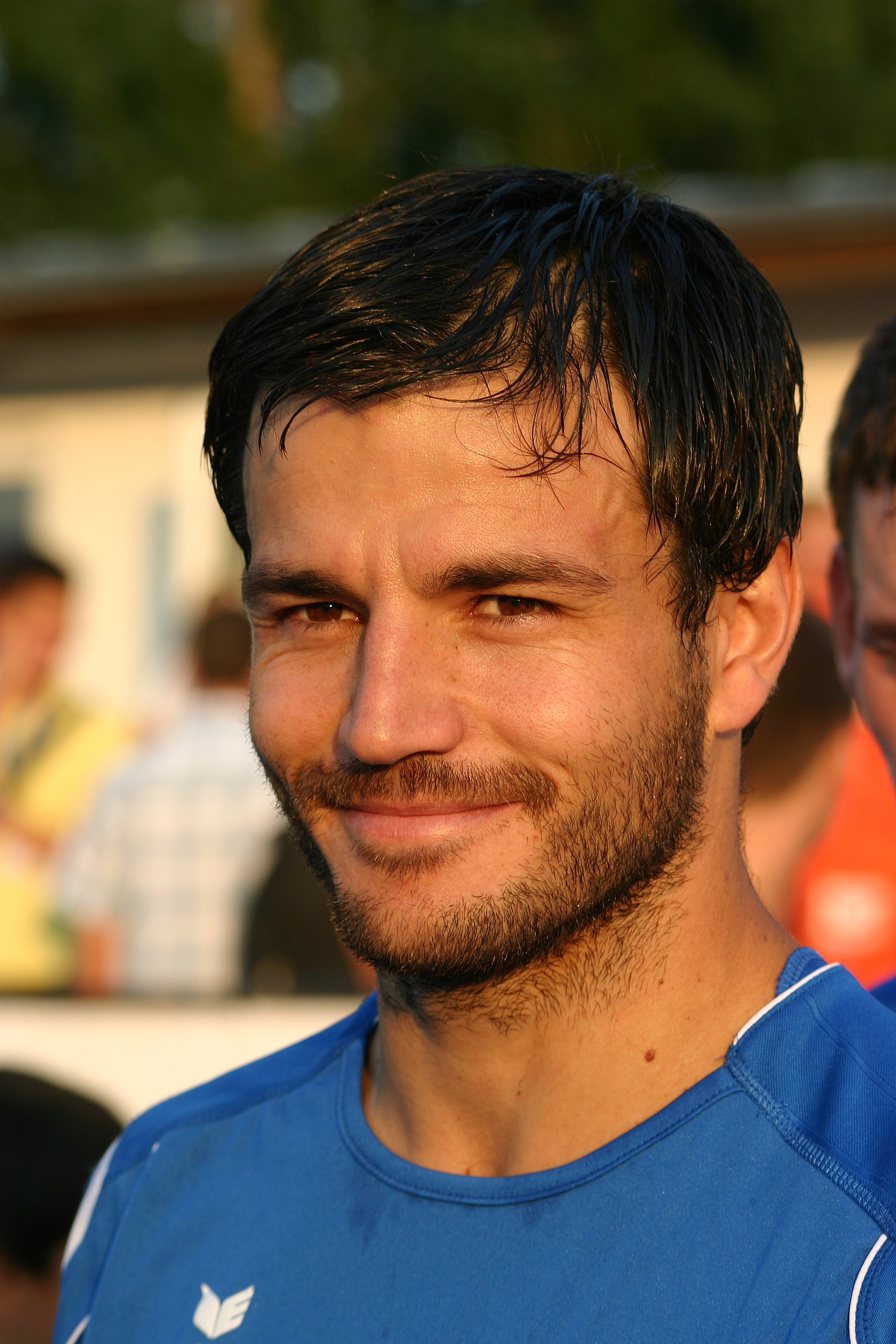

Personal information
- Date of birth: 4 December 1977 (age 48)
- Place of birth: Vienna, Austria
- Height: 1.76 m (5 ft 9 1/2 in)
- Position: Midfielder

Youth career
- Club Deportivo Motagua

Senior career*
Years	Team	Apps	(Gls)
1999–2000	Nacional	0	(0)
2000–2003	SV Wörgl	79	(35)
2003–2006	Rapid Wien	100	(13)
2006–2008	SV Ried	48	(8)
2008–2009	Wiener Neustadt	26	(3)
2009–2012	First Vienna	33	(5)

International career^{‡}
2005	Austria	2	(0)
- * Club domestic league appearances and goals as of 17 July 2011 ‡ National team caps and goals as of 15 December 2008

Sebastián Martínez (born 4 December 1977) is an Austrian former footballer.

== Personal life ==
Martínez was born in Austria, to the Uruguayan footballer Alberto Martínez. Martínez spent his early childhood in Uruguay, and holds dual citizenship.
