= Marek Kincl =

Czech footballer

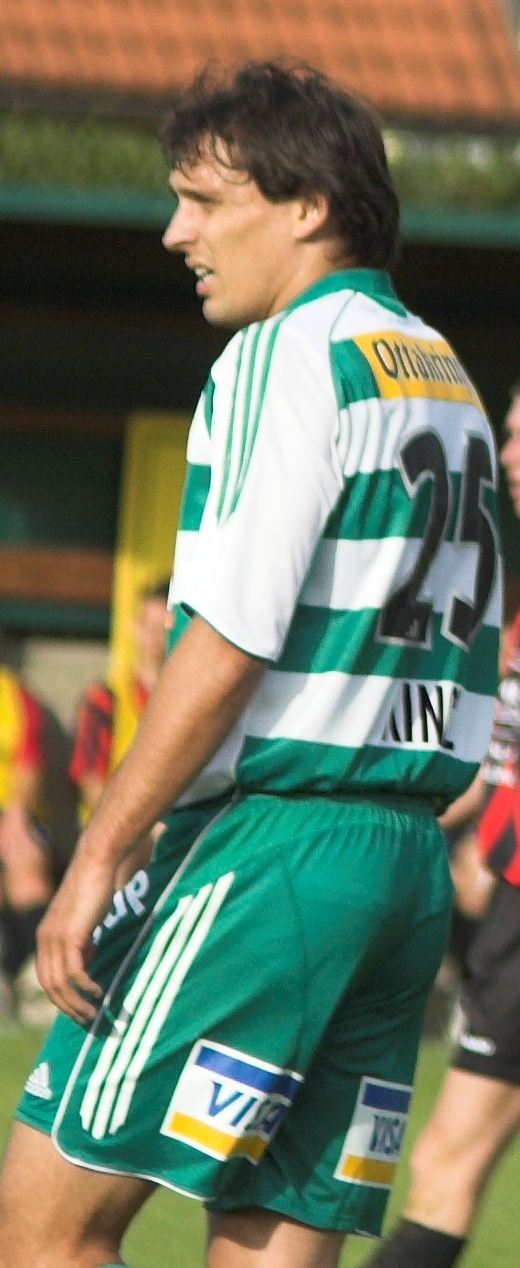

Personal information
- Date of birth: 3 April 1973 (age 53)
- Place of birth: Prague, Czechoslovakia
- Height: 1.90 m (6 ft 3 in)
- Position: Striker

Youth career
- 1978–1990: Slavoj Vyšehrad

Senior career*
Years	Team	Apps	(Gls)
1990–1991	FK Slavoj Vyšehrad	15	(8)
1991–1992	VTJ Slaný	20	(13)
1992–1994	SK Spolana Neratovice	34	(12)
1994–1995	FC Hradec Králové	22	(9)
1996	FK Chmel Blšany	15	(2)
1996	FC Slovan Liberec	3	(0)
1997	FC Zlin	14	(7)
1997–1998	Dukla Prague	27	(8)
1998–1999	FC Slovan Liberec	33	(6)
1999–2000	FK Viktoria Žižkov	22	(15)
2000–2003	Sparta Prague	81	(24)
2004	FC Zenit St. Petersburg	6	(0)
2004–2007	SK Rapid Wien	92	(27)
2007–2008	SK Schwadorf	23	(6)
2008–2010	Bohemians (Střížkov) Prague	27	(8)
Total		434	(145)

International career
1995	Czech Republic U21	1	(0)
2000	Czech Republic	2	(0)
- * Club domestic league appearances and goals

Marek Kincl (born 3 April 1973) is a Czech former footballer who played as a striker. He represented fourteen clubs in a career which began with Slavoj Vyšehrad in 1990 and concluded in 2010 after a stint at Bohemians (Střížkov) Prague, earning two caps for the Czech Republic national football team in 2000.

== Career ==
After leaving FC Zenit St. Petersburg, Kincl signed for SK Rapid Wien, where he won the Austrian Bundesliga in his first season.
