= Thomas Burgstaller =

Austrian footballer

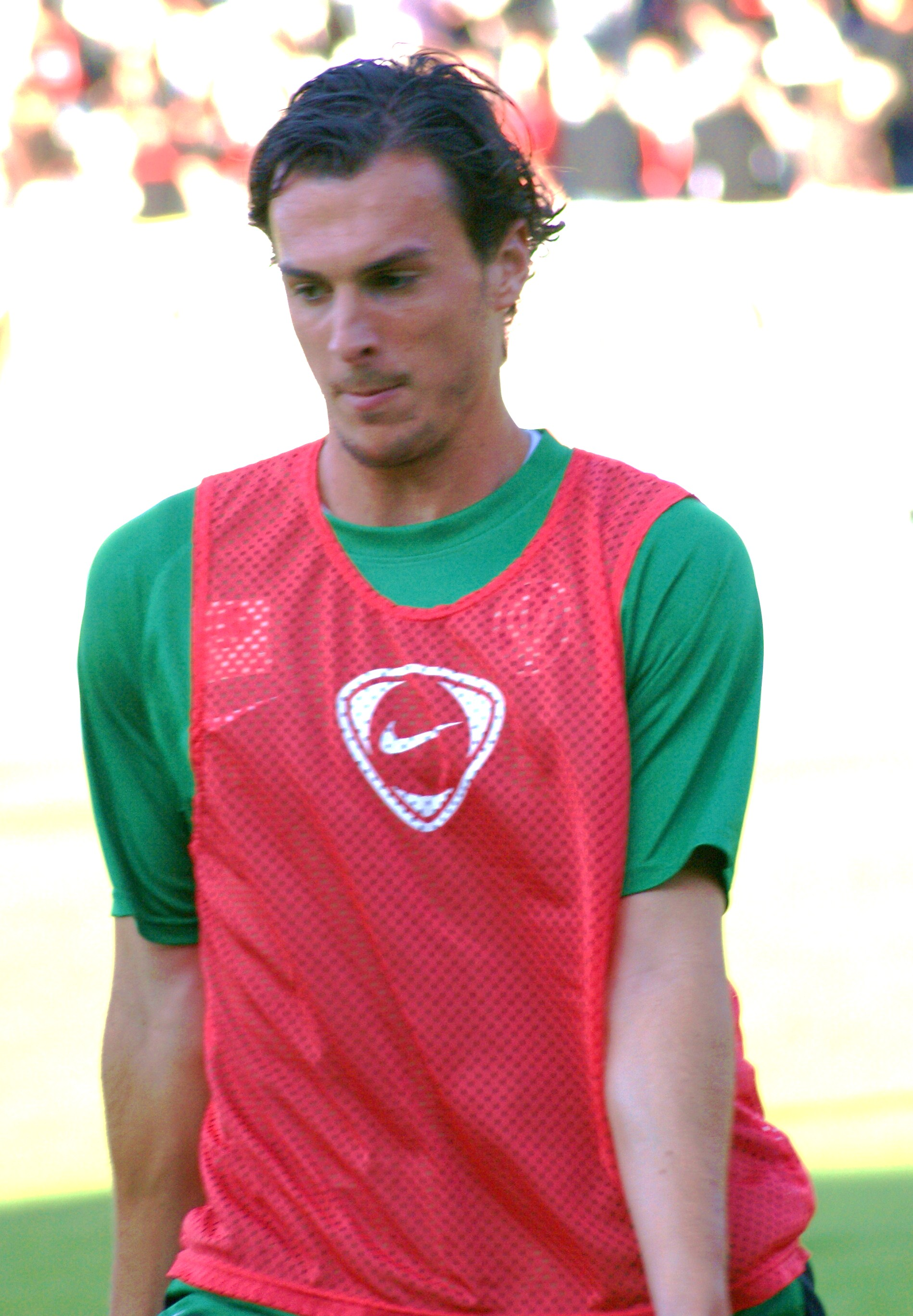

Personal information
- Full name: Thomas Burgstaller
- Date of birth: 9 January 1980 (age 46)
- Place of birth: Linz, Austria
- Height: 1.92 m (6 ft 3 1/2 in)
- Position: Centre back

Team information
- Current team: Schwaz
- Number: 20

Senior career*
Years	Team	Apps	(Gls)
2000–2003	Blau-Weiß Linz	33	(7)
2003–2007	Rapid Wien	41	(2)
2007–2008	Lustenau 07	22	(2)
2008–2010	Ried	65	(5)
2010–2012	Sturm Graz	51	(3)
2012–2013	Kapfenberger SV	16	(0)
2013–	Schwaz		
- * Club domestic league appearances and goals as of 4 May 2013

Thomas Burgstaller (born 9 January 1980) is an Austrian professional association football player currently playing for SC Schwaz. He plays as a defender.
