= Peter Hlinka =

Slovak footballer

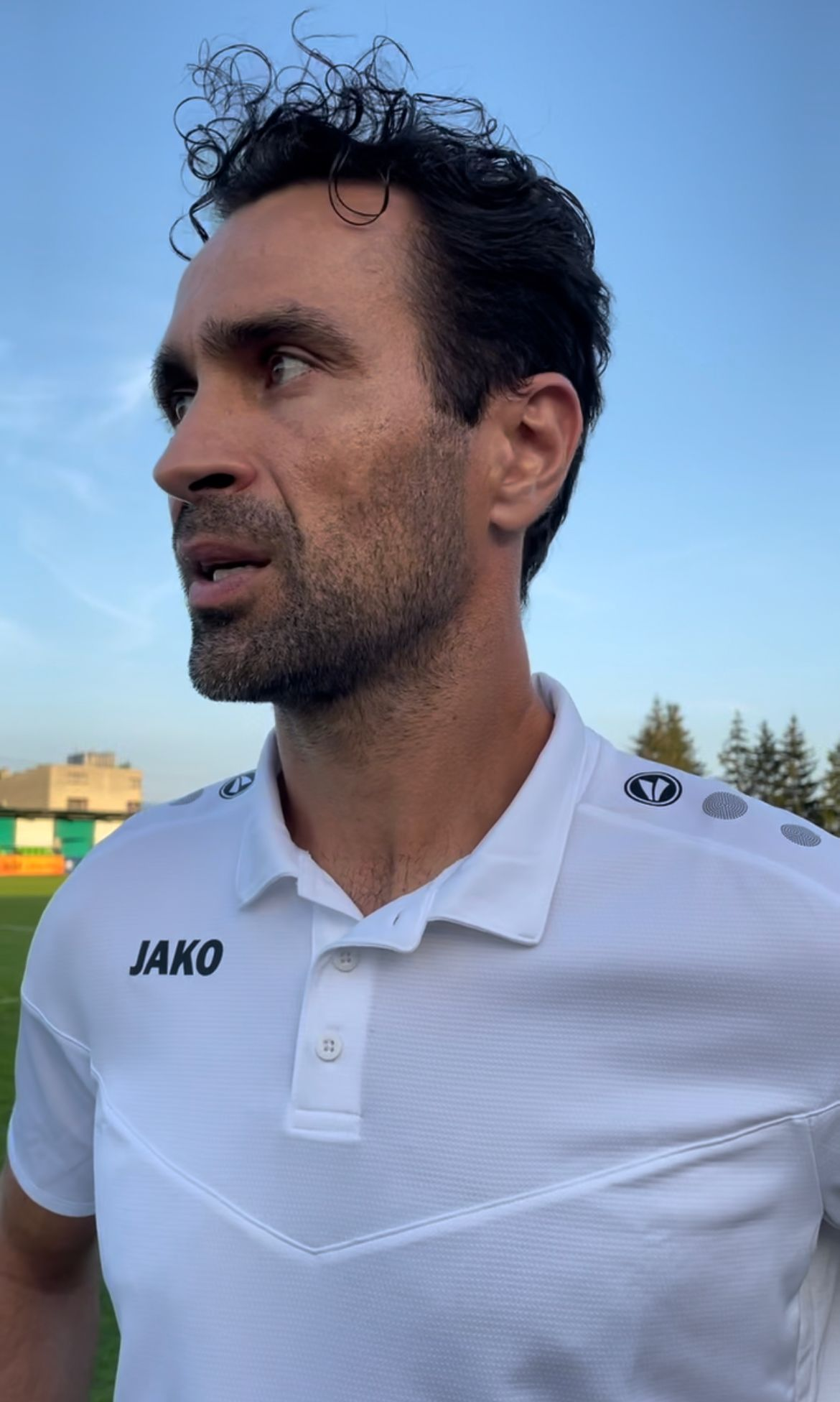
- Hlinka in September 2023

Personal information
- Date of birth: 5 December 1978 (age 47)
- Place of birth: Prešov, Czechoslovakia
- Height: 1.90 m (6 ft 3 in)
- Position: Midfielder

Youth career
- Tatran Prešov

Senior career*
Years	Team	Apps	(Gls)
1996–2000	Tatran Prešov	75	(1)
2000–2001	Sturm Graz	8	(1)
2001–2004	Bregenz	75	(8)
2004–2007	Rapid Wien	93	(11)
2007–2008	Augsburg	14	(0)
2008–2010	Sturm Graz	60	(7)
2010–2012	Austria Wien	56	(4)
2012–2014	Wiener Neustadt	62	(9)
2015	Wacker Innsbruck	15	(1)
2015–2016	Rapid Wien II	23	(0)
Total		483	(42)

International career
2002–2006	Slovakia	28	(1)

Managerial career
- 2017–2018: Wiener Neustadt (assistant)
- 2018–2020: First Vienna
- 2021: AS Trenčín
- 2023: SFC Opava
- 2023: Tatran Prešov
- 2024: Inter Bratislava
- * Club domestic league appearances and goals

Peter Hlinka (born 5 December 1978) is a Slovak professional football manager and former player who played as a midfielder. He was most recently in charge of Inter Bratislava. Prior to joining Inter, he was a head coach of Tatran Prešov.

He competed for Slovakia at the 2000 Summer Olympics.
