= 2000–01 Austrian Cup =

Tournament details
- Country: Austria

Final positions
- Champions: FC Kärnten
- Runners-up: Tirol Innsbruck

Tournament statistics
- Top goal scorer: Roland Kollmann (5)

The 2000–01 Austrian Cup (German: ÖFB-Cup) was the 67th season of Austria's nationwide football cup competition. It commenced with the matches of the first round in August 2000 and concluded with the Final on 27 May 2001. The competition was won by FC Kärnten after beating Tirol Innsbruck 2–1 after extra time and hence qualifying for the 2001–02 UEFA Cup.

== First round ==
Team 1	Score	Team 2
1 August 2000
FC Lustenau	3–2	SC Kundl
SC Rheindorf Altach	3–0	SPG Jenbach
FC Kufstein	3–0	FC Nenzing
SV Kirchbichl	1–2	SVG Reichenau
FC Tirol Amatuere	3–2 (a.e.t.)	FC Feldkirch
4 August 2000
Hofstetten-Grünau	0–6	Deutschkreutz
SC Wiener Neustadt	4–2	ASK Klingenbach
Kremser SC	4–0	SK Rapid Wien Amateure
SV Schwechat	0–2	Floridsdorfer AC
SV Stockerau	2–2 (a.e.t.) (4–3 p)	SV Neuberg
SC Zwettl	3–2	SV Leobendorf
SC-ESV Parndorf 1919	3–1	ASK Horitschon
SV Rohrbach	0–0 (a.e.t.) (5–3 p)	ASK Kottingbrunn
5 August 2000
FC Tulln	1–0	Polizei Feuerwehr
FC Stadlau	4–0	SC Ostbahn XI
SV Hundsheim	3–1	Wiener Sport-Club
6 August 2000
FK Austria Wien Amatuere	0–4	FC Waidhofen/Ybbs
SV Würmla	0–3	SC Eisenstadt
8 August 2000
Salzburger AK 1914	2–2 (a.e.t.) (4–5 p)	ASKÖ Donau Linz
Union Vöcklamarkt	4–0	Seekirchen
Kapfenberger SV	6–0	ASK Klagenfurt
FC Blau-Weiß Linz	4–1	Schwarzach
Sankt Florian	2–1	SKU Amstetten
9 August 2000
SV Grieskirchen	1–4	FC Puch bei Hallein
12 August 2000
SC Schwanenstadt	2–0	Union Weißkirchen
14 August 2000
Sankt Magdalena	1–2 (a.e.t.)	SV Ried Amateure
SK Eintracht Wels	0–1	ATSV Ranshofen
15 August 2000
1. FC Simmering	1–0	Sankt Peter/Au
SK Sturm Graz Amateure	1–3	TSV Hartberg
FC Gratkorn	1–1 (a.e.t.) (3–5 p)	FC St. Veit
SVA Kindberg	1–5	Wolfsberger AC
Zeltweg	2–1 (a.e.t.)	SV Leibnitz Flavia Solva
SVG Bleiburg	1–0	ASK Voitsberg
ASK Köflach	4–4 (a.e.t.) (4–2 p)	SAK Klagenfurt
FC Pasching	7–0	FC Zell am See
SV Anger	2–0	SV Rottenmann
SV Lendorf	0–3	SV Spittal
SV Pöllau	2–3	Grazer AK Amateure
SV Langenrohr	3–1	SV Horn

== Second round ==
2 September 2000	FC Tulln	1–8	SC Bregenz
16:30	Fahrnberger 90'	Report	Tomić 12', 34', 64'; Unger 24', 50', 83'; Ambrosius 37'; Rottensteiner 75'

6 September 2000	ASKÖ Donau Linz	2–1	Union Vöcklamarkt	Linz
19:00	Bauer 72'; Havel 80'	Report	Arnitz 90+2'	Stadium: Donauparkstadion; Referee: Bernhard Zauner

6 September 2000	1. Simmeringer SC	0–6	SV Wörgl	Vienna
19:00		Report	Miloti 44', 77'; Unterrainer 63', 72', 75'; Pichler 90' (pen.)	Referee: Robert Weber

12 September 2000	FC Blau-Weiß Linz	2–4 (a.e.t.)	SV Braunau	Linz
19:00	Peric 14'; Huemer 75'	Report	Stückler 19'; Forster 73', 117'; Jerabek 114'	Stadium: Donauparkstadion; Attendance: 600; Referee: Thomas Einwaller

12 September 2000	FC Deutschkreuz	0–1	SC Austria Lustenau	Deutschkreuz
19:00		Report	Olugbodi 64'	Attendance: 500; Referee: Gerhard Andrä

12 September 2000	FC Kufstein	1–4	DSV Leoben	Kufstein
19:00	Rothstein 35'	Report	Holemar 9', 73'; Prendergast 27'; Guggi 87'	Referee: Robert Schörgenhofer

12 September 2000	FC Puch	0–3	First Vienna FC	Puch
18:30		Report	Sindelar 34'; Jaschinski 45'; Cestnik 49'	Referee: Gottfried Schuiki

12 September 2000	FC Waidhofen/Ybbs	0–4	FC Kärnten	Waidhofen an der Ybbs
19:00		Report	Kollmann 55', 56'; Friesenbichler 58'; Schoppitsch 80'	Referee: Stefan Meßner

12 September 2000	Kapfenberger SV	4–0	FC Tirol Innsbruck Amateure	Kapfenberg
19:00	Maier 29'; Dragnjevic 49', 63'; Sušić 74' (pen.)	Report		Stadium: Alpenstadion; Referee: Sebastian Klauber-Larsen

12 September 2000	SC Eisenstadt	0–4	LASK Linz	Eisenstadt
19:00		Report	Sariyar 18'; Muhr 36'; Wisak 45' (o.g.); Brenner 89'	Stadium: Lindenstadion; Attendance: 200; Referee: Richard Kern

12 September 2000	SC Rheindorf Altach	0–1	FC Zeltweg	Altach
16:15		Report	Kühl 80'	Stadium: Stadion Schnabelholz; Attendance: 300; Referee: Markus Freund

12 September 2000	SC Schwanenstadt	1–3	Floridsdorfer AC	Schwanenstadt
16:15	Möseneder 59'	Report	Šimon 45'; Guso 46'; Bischof 63'	Attendance: 500; Referee: Franz Mostböck

12 September 2000	SC Zwettl	1–4	BSV Bad Bleiberg	Zwettl
19:00	Pavlek 82'	Report	Bleyer 61'; Breitenberger 73'; Kuljić 79'; Freissegger 90'	Stadium: Sportanlage Edelhof; Attendance: 700; Referee: Wolfgang Falb

12 September 2000	SC-ESV Parndorf 1919	1–6	SV Austria Salzburg	Parndorf
19:00	Vogel 89'	Report	Hobel 22'; Pfeifenberger 34'; Bradaric 50'; Rinnhofer 74'; Laeßig 78', 79'	Stadium: Heidebodenstadion; Attendance: 2,000; Referee: Robert Sedlacek

12 September 2000	SV Ried Amatuere	0–1	SV Stockerau
19:00		Report	Sela 78'	Attendance: 100; Referee: Louis Hofmann

12 September 2000	SV Rohrbach	0–1	SV Langenrohr	Rohrbach bei Mattersburg
19:00		Report	Ginsthofer 80'	Attendance: 500; Referee: Andreas Fellinger

12 September 2000	Union St. Florian	2–1	TSV Hartberg	Sankt Florian
18:30	Rudelstorfer 22'; Hofmann 89'	Report	Keglovits 45'	Attendance: 300; Referee: Franz Schwarzl

13 September 2000	SC Wiener Neustadt	0–3	FK Austria Wien	Wiener Neustadt
19:30		Report	Laimer 25' (o.g.); Topić 45', 71'	Stadium: Stadion Wiener Neustadt; Attendance: 2,500; Referee: Hannes Birgmann

13 September 2000	ASK Köflach	0–2	Wolfsberger AC	Köflach
19:00		Report	Kirisits 58'; Schuster 63'	Attendance: 600; Referee: Robert Epstein

13 September 2000	ASKÖ Pasching	2–3	VfB Admira/Wacker Mödling	Pasching
19:00	Metlitskiy 2'; Greil 62'; Schürz (red card) 78'	Report	Brandmayer 9'; Micheu 14'; Banovits 56'	Stadium: Waldstadion; Attendance: 1,500; Referee: Bernhard Brugger

13 September 2000	Grazer AK Amateure	2–0	SV Mattersburg	Graz
16:15	Pichler 14'; Marth 90+5'	Report		Stadium: GAK-Platz; Referee: Manfred Krassnitzer

13 September 2000	FC Lustenau 07	0–2	SV Ried	Lustenau
16:45		Report	Rothbauer 58'; Akagündüz 76'	Attendance: 1,000; Referee: Michael Daxauer

13 September 2000	SV Austria Salzburg Amateure	0–3	SC Untersiebenbrunn	Salzburg
16:45		Report	Szantó 19'; Schandl 34'; Pomper 73'	Stadium: Taxham; Attendance: 200; Referee: Christian Klammer

13 September 2000	SV Hundsheim	3–1	FC ÖMV Stadlau	Hundsheim
16:15	Narbekovas 14' (pen.); Tomaskovic 62'; Wetrowsky 89'	Report	Kreuz 53'	Referee: Paul Pethö

13 September 2000	SV Spittal	1–3	WSG Wattens	Spittal an der Drau
19:00	Mijic 10'	Report	Freund 62'; Sidibe 74'; Ribeiro 77'	Stadium: Goldeck-Stadion; Referee: Erwin Hänsel

13 September 2000	SVG Bleiburg	3–1	FC St. Veit	Bleiburg
16:15	Srmtnik 45', 90+1'; Baumgartner 76'; Ribeiro 77'	Report	Gilgenreiner 14'	Attendance: 400; Referee: Thomas Laschober

13 September 2000	WSV ATSV Ranshofen	0–1	Kremser SC	Ranshofen
16:15		Report	Steininger 15'	Referee: Johann Hechtl

== Third round ==
3 April 2001	ASKÖ Donau Linz	1–3	LASK Linz	Linz
19:00	Höretseder 4'	Report	Bauer 46' (o.g.); Frigård 90', 90+3'	Stadium: ASKÖ Donau-Platz; Attendance: 1,800; Referee: Thomas Steiner

3 April 2001	Grazer AK Amateure	1–4	SV Braunau	Graz
16:30	Milopoulos 26'	Report	Jerabek 45'; Rottensteiner 61'; Weidinger 76' (pen.); Fallmann 90+2'	Stadium: Eggenberg; Attendance: 200; Referee: Louis Hofmann

3 April 2001	Kapfenberger SV	0–0 (a.e.t.) (5–4 p)	SC Untersiebenbrunn	Kapfenberg
19:00		Report		Stadium: Alpenstadion; Attendance: 800; Referee: Manfred Krassnitzer

3 April 2001	Kremser SC	3–0	SV Wörgl	Krems an der Donau
19:30	Ecker 33'; Karl 35', 56'	Report		Stadium: Sepp Doll-Stadion; Attendance: 1,000; Referee: Gottfried Schuiki

3 April 2001	SV Hundsheim	3–2	BSV Bad Bleiberg	Hundsheim
16:30	Nastl 12' (pen.); Bruck 24'; Wetrowsky 69'	Report	Sabitzer 19'; Bruck 89' (o.g.); Bacher (yellow card) 53' (red card)	Attendance: 700; Referee: Christian Klammer

3 April 2001	SV Langenrohr	0–4	SK Rapid Wien	Langenrohr
16:30		Report	Radovic 50'; Wetl 59'; Wagner 66'; Baumühlner 72' (o.g.)	Attendance: 3,600; Referee: Wolfgang Falb

3 April 2001	SV Stockerau	0–3	Schwarz-Weiß Bregenz	Stockerau
19:00		Report	Ambrosius 46', 57', 79'	Stadium: Alte Au; Attendance: 200; Referee: Gerald Lehner

3 April 2001	SVG Bleiburg	0–3	DSV Leoben	Bleiberg
16:00		Report	Pavlek 50'; Grubor 64'; Linz 87' (pen.)	Attendance: 350; Referee: Michael Daxauer

3 April 2001	SVG Reichenau	1–6	FC Admira Wacker Mödling	Innsbruck
18:00	Schmölz 66'	Report	Mlinar 31'; Fellner 41'; Bozgo 58'; Oerlemans 78'; Datoru 80', 89'	Stadium: Tivoli; Attendance: 1,500; Referee: Robert Schörgenhofer

3 April 2001	SK Sturm Graz	4–2 (a.e.t.)	FK Austria Wien	Graz
19:00	Szabics 22'; Schopp 53' (pen.); Hlinka 96'; Amoah 120'	Report	Rost 41'; Mayrleb 68'	Stadium: Arnold Schwarzenegger Stadion; Attendance: 6,500; Referee: Manfred Schüttengruber

3 April 2001	Union St. Florian	0–1	SC Austria Lustenau	Sankt Florian
19:00		Report	Enzenebner 45'	Stadium: Unionsportplatz; Attendance: 350; Referee: Robert Weber

3 April 2001	First Vienna FC	1–2	FC Kärnten	Vienna
19:00	Enguelle 6'	Report	Schoppitsch 33'; Feichter 39'; Pogatetz (yellow card) 67' (red card)	Stadium: Hohe Warte Stadium; Attendance: 600; Referee: Bernhard Brugger

3 April 2001	Wolfsberger AC	2–1	WSG Wattens	Wolfsberg
19:00	Puff 13'; Prendergast 70'	Report	Sara 60'	Stadium: Stadion Wolfsberg; Attendance: 300; Referee: Wolfgang Sowa

4 April 2001	FC Zeltweg	1–0 (a.e.t.)	Grazer AK	Zeltweg
16:30	Reichhold 116'	Report	Adu Tutu (yellow card) 120' (red card)	Attendance: 2,500; Referee: Hannes Birgmann

4 April 2001	Floridsdorfer AC	0–2	SV Austria Salzburg	Vienna
18:30		Report	Sigþórsson 55', 88'; Suazo (red card) 80'	Stadium: FAC-Platz; Attendance: 1,700; Referee: Dietmar Drabek

== Fourth round ==
10 April 2001	DSV Leoben	0–1	FC Tirol Innsbruck	Leoben
19:00	Grubor 17'	Report	Glieder 74'; Scharrer 80' (pen.)	Stadium: Stadion Donawitz; Attendance: 5,500; Referee: Thomas Steiner

10 April 2001	FC Kärnten	2–0	LASK Linz	Klagenfurt
19:00	Hota 55'; Kollmann 67'	Report		Stadium: Wörthersee Stadion; Attendance: 3,200; Referee: Fritz Stuchlik

10 April 2001	FC Zeltweg	1–1 (a.e.t.) (4–5 p)	SV Hundsheim	Zeltweg
16:30	Reichhold 31'	Report	Nastl 41' (pen.)	Attendance: 1,000; Referee: Louis Hofmann

10 April 2001	Kremser SC	0–0 (a.e.t.) (1–3 p)	SV Austria Salzburg	Krems
16:30		Report		Stadium: Sepp Doll-Stadion; Attendance: 4,200; Referee: Manfred Krassnitzer

10 April 2001	Schwarz-Weiß Bregenz	0–0 (a.e.t.) (4–5 p)	SV Braunau	Bregenz
19:00		Report		Stadium: Casino Stadium; Attendance: 1,000; Referee: Michael Daxauer
	Penalties
	Kogler (penalty scored); Unger (penalty missed); Geiger (penalty scored); Regtop (penalty scored); Ambrosius (penalty scored)		(penalty scored) Weidinger; (penalty scored) Fallmann; (penalty scored) Schriebl; (penalty scored) Rottensteiner; (penalty scored) Fürstaller

10 April 2001	SK Sturm Graz	2-0	SC Austria Lustenau	Graz
19:00	Fleurquin 15'; Szabics 65'	Report		Stadium: Arnold Schwarzenegger Stadion; Attendance: 4,608; Referee: Hannes Birgmann

10 April 2001	Wolfsberger AC	0–3	VfB Admira Wacker Mödling	Wolfsberg
19:00		Report	Bozgo 33'; Oerlemans 36', 63'	Stadium: Stadion Wolfsberg; Attendance: 1,500; Referee: Gottfried Schuiki

11 April 2001	Kapfenberger SV	2–3	SK Rapid Wien	Kapfenberg
19:00	Toth 66'; Rosenbichler 83'	Report	Wallner 30'; Jazić 43'; Schießwald 89'; Zingler (red card) 67'	Stadium: Alpenstadion; Attendance: 3,500; Referee: Gerald Lehner

== Quarter-finals ==
17 April 2001	FC Kärnten	1–0	SV Braunau	Klagenfurt
19:00	Hota 76'	Report		Stadium: Wörthersee Stadion; Attendance: 3,000; Referee: Hannes Birgmann

17 April 2001	SV Hundsheim	0–2	FC Tirol Innsbruck	Hundsheim
16:30		Report	Ježek 28'; Glieder 57'	Attendance: 2,500; Referee: Manfred Krassnitzer

17 April 2001	SK Sturm Graz	2–2 (a.e.t.) (3–4 p)	SK Rapid Wien	Graz
19:00	Szabics 11'; Schopp 29' (pen.)	Report	Saler 20'; Wallner 74'	Stadium: Arnold-Schwarzenegger-Stadion; Attendance: 10,572; Referee: Dietmar Drabek
	Penalties
	Vastić (penalty scored); Schopp (penalty scored); Schupp (penalty missed); Prilasnig (penalty missed); Fleurquin (penalty scored)		Schöttel (penalty scored); Wallner (penalty missed); Wetl (penalty scored); Ivanschitz (penalty scored); Wagner (penalty scored)

17 April 2001	VfB Admira/Wacker Mödling	2–0	SV Austria Salzburg	Südstadt
19:00	Oerlemans 13'; Datoru 88'	Report	Suazo (yellow card) 68' (red card)	Stadium: Bundesstadion Südstadt; Attendance: 1,500; Referee: Gerald Lehner

== Semi-finals ==
8 May 2001	VfB Admira/Wacker Mödling	2–3 (a.e.t.)	FC Kärnten	Südstadt
19:00	Bozgo 28'; Ziervogel 87'; Micheu (yellow card) 102' (red card)	Report	Kollmann 65', 90', 119'	Stadium: Bundesstadion Südstadt; Attendance: 5,500; Referee: Wolfgang Falb

9 May 2001	SK Rapid Wien	0–1	FC Tirol Innsbruck	Vienna
18:00	Savićević (red card) 90+2'	Report	Barisic 45'; Hörtnagl (red card) 90+2'	Stadium: Ernst-Happel-Stadion; Attendance: 16,000; Referee: Bernhard Brugger

== Final ==
=== Details ===
27 May 2001
20:30

FC Kärnten	2–1 (a.e.t.)	Tirol Innsbruck
Kollmann 35'; Steiner 113'	Report	Glieder 70'

Ernst-Happel-Stadion, Wien
Attendance: 7,084
Referee: Stefan Meßner

GK	(Austria) Ronald Unger	(yellow card) 65'
DF	(Austria) Heimo Vorderegger	(yellow card) 60'
DF	(Croatia) Stipe Brnas
DF	(Croatia) Željko Vuković
DF	(Austria) Emanuel Pogatetz
MF	(Austria) Christian Sablatnig		(substituted off) 75'
MF	(Bosnia and Herzegovina) Almedin Hota	(yellow card) 113'
MF	(Austria) Roman Stary	Booked
MF	(Austria) Thomas Höller
FW	(Austria) Bruno Friesenbichler		(substituted off) 82'
FW	(Austria) Roland Kollmann		(substituted off) 120'
Substitutes:
MF	(Austria) Mario Steiner		(substituted on) 75'
MF	(Austria) Andreas Heraf		(substituted on) 82'
FW	(Austria) Jürgen Kampel		(substituted on) 120'
Manager:
(Austria) Walter Schachner

GK	(Austria) Marc Ziegler
DF	(Austria) Michael Baur
DF	(Austria) Walter Kogler
DF	(Austria) Stephan Marasek	(yellow card) 58' (red card) 118'
DF	(Austria) Andreas Schiener		(substituted off) 46'
MF	(Austria) Roland Kirchler		(substituted off) 46'
MF	(Austria) Zoran Barisic		(substituted off) 46'
MF	(Austria) Jürgen Panis
MF	(Poland) Jerzy Brzęczek	(yellow card) 10'
FW	(Austria) Eduard Glieder	(yellow card) 27'
FW	(Poland) Radosław Gilewicz
Substitutes:
MF	(Austria) Markus Scharrer	(red card) 115'	(substituted on) 46'
FW	(Austria) Wolfgang Mair		(substituted on) 46'
MF	(Czech Republic) Patrik Ježek		(substituted on) 46'
Manager:
(Austria) Kurt Jara

Match rules

- 90 minutes.
- 30 minutes of extra-time if necessary.
- Penalty shootout if scores still level.
