= 2001–02 Austrian Cup =

Tournament details
- Country: Austria

Final positions
- Champions: Grazer AK
- Runners-up: SK Sturm Graz

The 2001–02 Austrian Cup (German: ÖFB-Cup) was the 68th season of Austria's nationwide football cup competition. It commenced with the matches of the First Round in August 2001 and concluded with the Final on 12 May 2002. The competition was won by Grazer AK after beating SK Sturm Graz 3–2 and hence qualifying for the 2002–03 UEFA Cup.

== First round ==
Team 1	Score	Team 2
21 August 2001
FC Sankt Veit	1–2	Schwarz-Weiß Bregenz
FC Zeltweg	1–4	SV Austria Salzburg
SV Bad Aussee	0–3	SC Austria Lustenau
SV Langenrohr	3–2 (a.e.t.)	WSG Wattens
Wiener Sport-Club	1–0	SV Neuberg
SV Schwarzach im Pongau	0–5	SV Braunau
Austria Salzburg Amateure	2–4	LASK Linz
ASK Voitsberg	0–7	FK Austria Wien
FC Waidhofen an der Ybbs	1–0	SV Wörgl
Kapfenberger SV	3–0	SK St. Magdalena
LASK Linz Amateure	3–1	SV Schwechat
SC Schwanenstadt	2–2 (a.e.t.) (4–3 p)	ASKÖ Pasching
SV Hall	0–2 (a.e.t.)	SK Sturm Graz
SV Spittal an der Drau	1–2 (a.e.t.)	DSV Leoben
TSV Hartberg	3–3 (a.e.t.) (4–3 p)	FC Lustenau
Wolfsberger AC	0–5	SV Ried
1. Wiener Neustädter SC	1–0	Polizei/Feuerwehr Wien
ASKÖ Klingenbach	1–2	SV Mattersburg
ASK Kottingbrunn	3–0	SV Axams
DSG Union Perg	6–2	Union St. Florian
FC Deutschkreutz	1–5	SK Rapid Wien Amateure
SC Kundl	2–4	VfB Admira/Wacker Mödling
SC Zwettl	0–4	BSV Bad Bleiberg
SC-ESV Parndorf	1–3	SC Untersiebenbrunn

== Second round ==
Team 1	Score	Team 2
17 September 2001
Kapfenberger SV	0–0 (a.e.t.) (2–3 p)	BSV Bad Bleiberg
18 September 2001
Wiener Sport-Club	0–2	SC Untersiebenbrunn
SK Rapid Wien Amateure	1–6	SK Sturm Graz
DSG Union Perg	3–5	SV Mattersburg
LASK Linz Amateure	0–2	DSV Leoben
SC Schwanenstadt	0–1	FK Austria Wien
TSV Hartberg	1–2	SV Ried
VfB Admira/Wacker Mödling	1–2	Schwarz-Weiß Bregenz
1. Wiener Neustädter SC	2–1	Austria Lustenau
ASK Kottingbrunn	1–2	SV Austria Salzburg
19 September 2001
SV Langenrohr	1–4	LASK Linz
16 October 2001
FC Waidhofen an der Ybbs	4–0	SV Braunau

== Third round ==
Team 1	Score	Team 2
5 March 2002
SV Mattersburg	1–0	Schwarz-Weiß Bregenz
19 March 2002
FK Austria Wien	2–3	SC Untersiebenbrunn
DSV Leoben	1–1 (a.e.t.) (2–4 p)	BSV Bad Bleiberg
FC Waidhofen an der Ybbs	1–3	Grazer AK
1. Wiener Neustädter SC	0–4	SK Sturm Graz
SK Rapid Wien	1–2	SV Austria Salzburg
SV Ried	1–2	LASK Linz
20 March 2002
FC Kärnten	1–0	FC Tirol Innsbruck

== Quarter-finals ==
9 April 2002	BSV Bad Bleiberg	2–2 (a.e.t.) (4–2 p)	FC Kärnten	Bad Bleiberg
19:00	Hobel 73'; Breitenberger 90+1'	Report	Hota 20'; Vorderegger 66'	Stadium: Drei Lärchenstadion; Attendance: 5,000; Referee: Gerald Lehner
	Penalties
	Rovcanin (penalty scored); Hobel (penalty scored); Linimair (penalty scored); Hieblinger (penalty scored)		Vuković (penalty missed); Stary (penalty missed); Höller (penalty scored); Vorderegger (penalty scored)

9 April 2002	SC Untersiebenbrunn	2–2 (a.e.t.) (7–8 p)	Grazer AK	Untersiebenbrunn
19:00	Aigner 67'; Hacker 79'	Report	Bazina 25'; Standfest 61'	Stadium: Marchfeldstadion; Attendance: 3,000; Referee: Konrad Plautz

10 April 2002	SV Austria Salzburg	3–1	LASK Linz	Salzburg
18:30	Pfeifenberger 6'; Brenner 58'; Jank 70'	Report	Kocijan 50'	Stadium: Lehener Stadion; Attendance: 4,000; Referee: Thomas Steiner

10 April 2002	SV Mattersburg	0–1	SK Sturm Graz	Mattersburg
19:15		Report	Wetl 3'	Stadium: Pappelstadion; Attendance: 15,000; Referee: Dietmar Drabek

== Semi-finals ==
24 April 2002	SK Sturm Graz	3–2	BSV Bad Bleiberg	Graz
18:45	Amoah 37'; Bosnar 76'; Pregelj 86'	Report	Hobel 25'; Bradaric 59'	Stadium: Arnold Schwarzenegger-Stadion; Attendance: 3,181; Referee: Manfred Schüttengruber

25 April 2002	Grazer AK	2–0 (a.e.t.)	SV Austria Salzburg	Graz
18:45	Tutu 91'; Kusi-Asare 120'	Report		Stadium: Arnold Schwarzenegger-Stadion; Attendance: 2,300; Referee: Dietmar Drabek

== Final ==
=== Details ===
12 May 2002
17:25

Grazer AK	3–2	Sturm Graz
Brunmayr 15' (pen.), 20'; Kusi-Asare 36'	Report	Vastić 58', 90+1'

Arnold Schwarzenegger-Stadion, Graz
Attendance: 15,400
Referee: Bernhard Brugger

GK	(Austria) Franz Almer
DF	(Togo) Éric Akoto	Booked
DF	(Croatia) Mario Tokić
DF	(Austria) Jürgen Hartmann	(yellow card) (yellow-red card) 67'
DF	(Austria) Dieter Ramusch	Booked
DF	(Federal Republic of Yugoslavia) Boban Dmitrović		(substituted off) 76'
MF	(Slovenia) Aleš Čeh		(substituted off) 75'
MF	(Austria) René Aufhauser	Booked
MF	(Croatia) Mario Bazina		(substituted off) 68'
FW	(Sweden) Jones Kusi-Asare
FW	(Austria) Ronald Brunmayr		(substituted off) 85'
Substitutes:
DF	(Slovakia) Peter Lérant		(substituted on) 68'
DF	(Austria) Gregor Pötscher		(substituted on) 85'
MF	(Austria) Joachim Standfest		(substituted on) 76'
Manager:
(Netherlands) Thijs Libregts

GK	(Germany) Daniel Hoffmann
DF	(Croatia) Andrej Panadić
DF	(Austria) Günther Neukirchner		(substituted off) 16'
DF	(Chile) Francisco Rojas
DF	(Australia) Eddy Bosnar	Booked
MF	(Austria) Gerald Strafner	Booked
MF	(Austria) Roman Mählich		(substituted off) 46'
MF	(Austria) Arnold Wetl
MF	(Democratic Republic of the Congo) Alain Masudi		(substituted off) 46'
FW	(Austria) Ivica Vastić
FW	(Austria) Mario Haas
Substitutes:
MF	(Slovenia) Martin Pregelj		(substituted on) 16'
DF	(Argentina) Mariano Fernández		(substituted on) 46'
FW	(Ghana) Charles Amoah		(substituted on) 46'
Manager:
(Bosnia and Herzegovina) Ivica Osim

Match rules

- 90 minutes.
- 30 minutes of extra-time if necessary.
- Penalty shootout if scores still level.
