= Breitenberger =

Breitenberger is a surname. Notable people with the surname include:

- Edward Breitenberger, also known as Edd Byrnes, (1932–2020), American actor
- Gerhard Breitenberger (disambiguation)
  - Gerhard Breitenberger (footballer, born 1954), Austrian footballer
  - Gerhard Breitenberger (footballer, born 1979), Austrian footballer
