= Christian Sablatnig =

Austrian footballer

Personal information
- Date of birth: November 2, 1979 (age 46)
- Place of birth: Klagenfurt, Austria
- Height: 1.68 m (5 ft 6 in)
- Position: Midfielder

Senior career*
Years	Team	Apps	(Gls)
1996–2003	FC Kärnten	93	(4)
1999	→Wolfsberger AC		
2003–2004	BSV Bad Bleiberg	20	(2)
2004–2006	SVG Bleiburg		
2006–2007	SC St. Stefan		
2007	SV Feldkirchen	12	(0)
2007–2010	SC St. Stefan	9	(0)
2010–2012	SK Austria Klagenfurt	50	(11)
2012–2013	ASV Klagenfurt	14	(6)
2014	SV Magdalensberg		
2014–	ASKÖ Köttmannsdorf	43	(11)
- * Club domestic league appearances and goals

Christian Sablatnig (born November 2, 1979) is a retired Austrian football defender.

== Honours ==
- Austrian Cup winner: 2000-01
- Austrian Supercup winner: 2001
- Austrian Football First League winner: 2000-01
