= Mario Steiner =

Austrian footballer

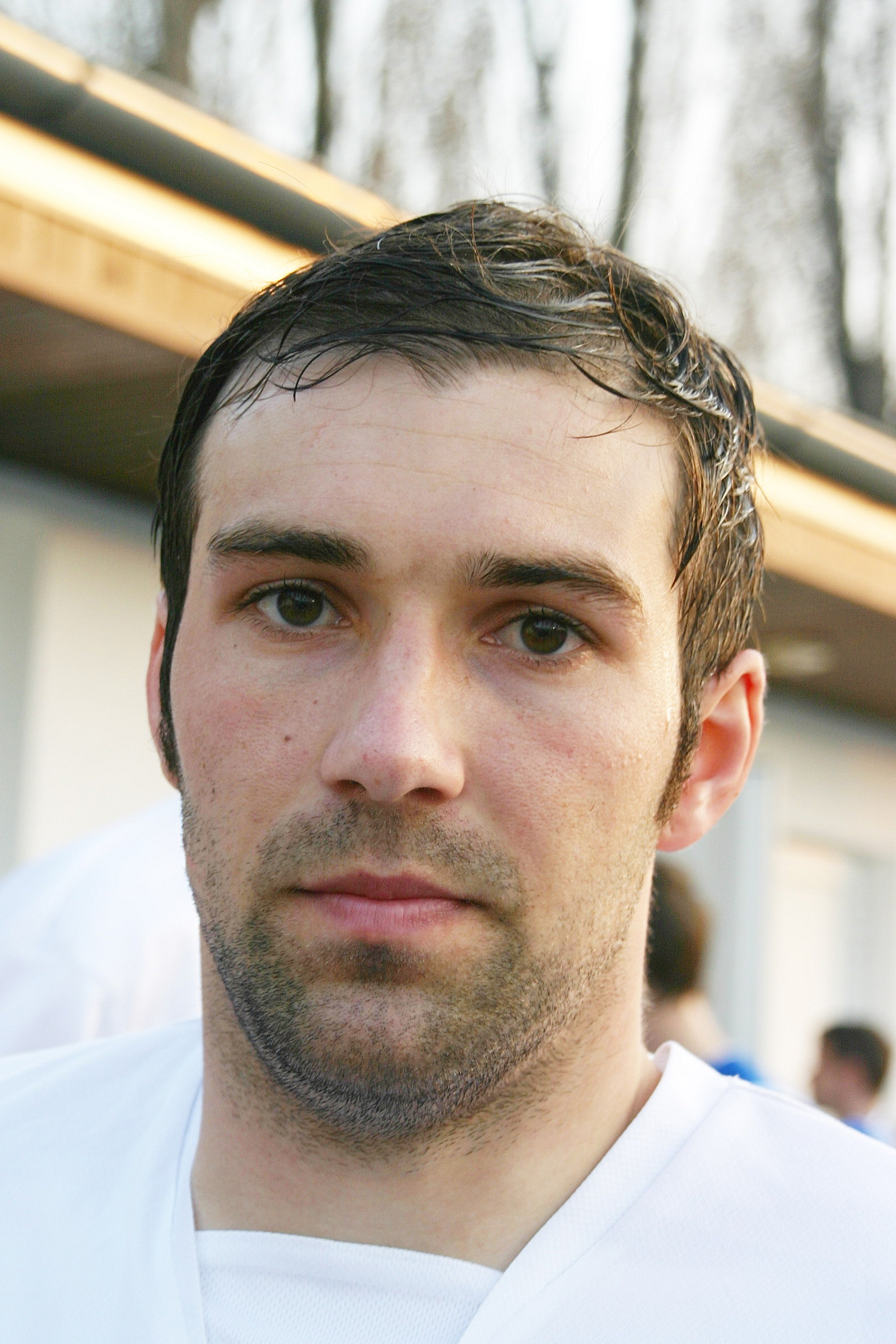
- Steiner in 2009

Personal information
- Date of birth: 12 December 1982 (age 43)
- Place of birth: Villach, Austria
- Height: 1.80 m (5 ft 11 in)
- Position: Midfielder

Team information
- Current team: SV Afritz

Youth career
- SV Afritz
- FC Kärnten

Senior career*
Years	Team	Apps	(Gls)
2000–2003	FC Kärnten	58	(1)
2003–2004	BSV Bad Bleiberg	23	(2)
2004–2005	SC-ESV Parndorf 1919	26	(5)
2005–2006	FC Waidhofen/Ybbs	15	(1)
2006	SV Spittal/Drau		
2006–2007	SK St. Andrä	29	(3)
2007–2008	FC Kärnten	21	(2)
2008–2009	Vöcklabrucker SC	27	(2)
2009–2011	FC Gratkorn	34	(2)
2011–2012	Grazer AK	17	(1)
2012–2013	Villacher SV	20	(0)
2013–2015	SV Sachsenburg	21	(3)
2015–	SV Afritz		

International career
2001–2002	Austria U-21	5	(0)
- * Club domestic league appearances and goals

Mario Steiner (born 12 December 1982) is an Austrian football midfielder currently playing for SV Afritz.

== Honours ==
- Austrian Cup winner: 2000-01
- Austrian Supercup winner: 2001
- Austrian Football First League winner: 2000-01
- Austrian Regional League Central winner: 2011-12
