= Thorstein Helstad =

Norwegian footballer (born 1977)

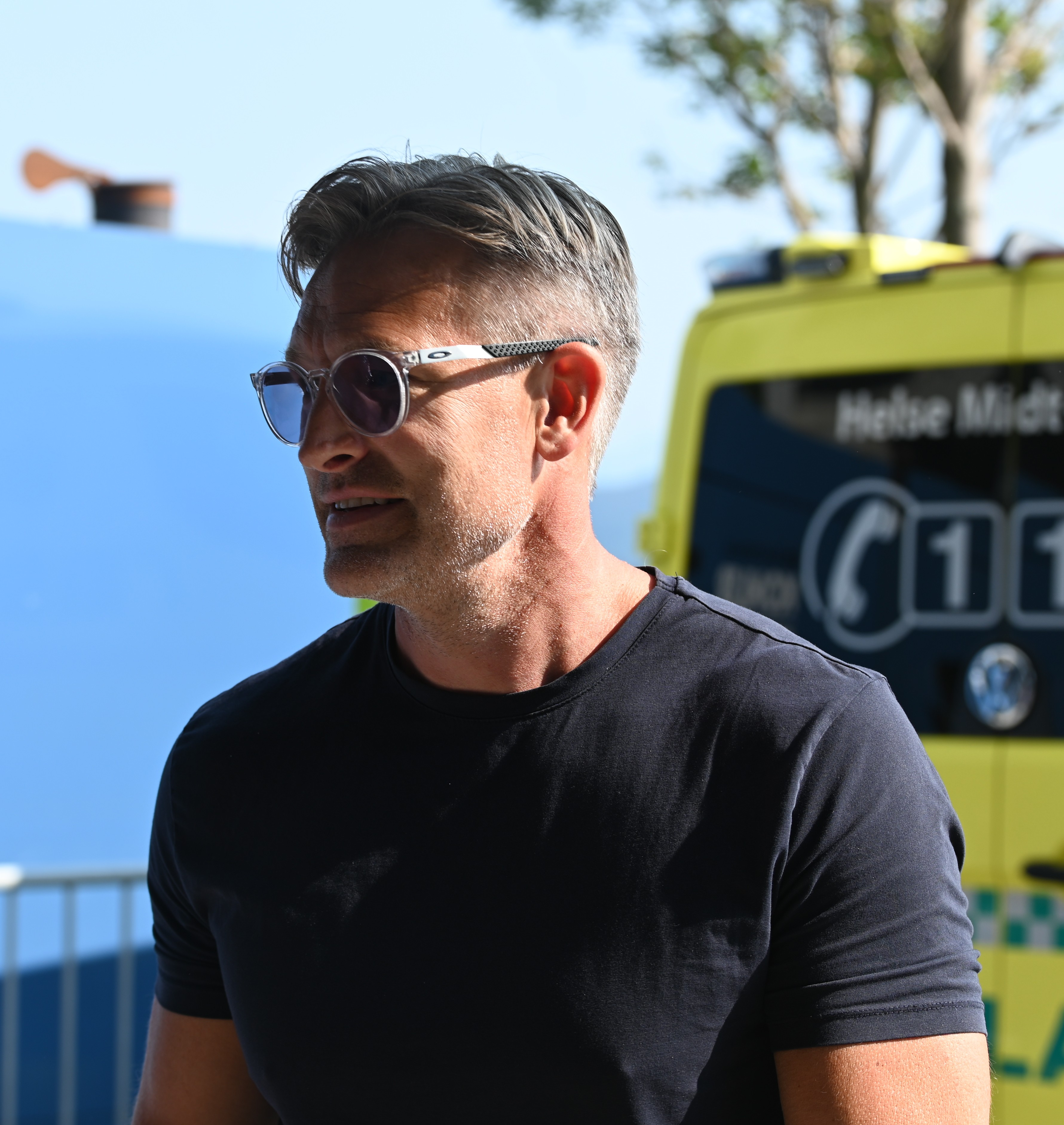
- Helstad in 2026

Personal information
- Date of birth: 28 April 1977 (age 49)
- Place of birth: Hamar, Norway
- Height: 1.87 m (6 ft 2 in)
- Position: Forward

Youth career
- 1994: Fart

Senior career*
Years	Team	Apps	(Gls)
1995–1997	HamKam	46	(12)
1998–2002	Brann	99	(54)
2002–2004	Austria Wien	59	(12)
2004–2006	Rosenborg	36	(15)
2006–2008	Brann	48	(35)
2008–2011	Le Mans	98	(35)
2011–2012	Monaco	6	(0)
2012–2013	Lillestrøm	34	(8)
2014	Gamle Oslo	6	(4)
Total		432	(175)

International career
1996–1999	Norway U21	30	(5)
2000–2010	Norway	38	(10)
- * Club domestic league appearances and goals

Thorstein Helstad (born 28 April 1977) is a Norwegian former professional footballer who played as a forward.

He was regarded as one of the most prominent strikers in the Norwegian top division during the 2000s, particularly noted for his goal-scoring record with SK Brann. Helstad won domestic league titles in both Norway and Austria and represented the Norway national team at senior and youth levels.

== Early life and youth career ==
Helstad was born in Hamar, Norway and started his career in his local club FL Fart where he at age 16 scored two goals against Løten in 1993 that made the team win promotion to Norwegian Third Division.

== Club career ==
=== HamKam ===
He transferred to the local Norwegian First Division side HamKam, at the age of 18, and played for the club between 1995 and 1997.

=== Brann ===
In 1998, Helstad signed for Brann, where he enjoyed the most successful period of his career. Helstad played for Brann in two spells, from 1998 to 2002 and from 2006 to 2008.

He became the club’s leading striker and finished as the Tippeliga top scorer in both 2000 and 2001 and won the Kniksen Award as the best striker in 2000.

=== Austria Wien ===
Helstad played for Austria Wien from 2002 to 2004. During the 2002 - 2003 season, he won both the Austrian Bundesliga and the Austrian Supercup with the club.

=== Rosenborg ===
After scoring 14 goals in 69 matches for the Austrian side, Helstad returned to Norway where he signed a four-year deal with Rosenborg. He won the Norwegian league title with Rosenborg in 2004 and 2006.

With Steffen Iversen as the preferred striker, Helstad never managed to gain a regular spot in the first squad, but was often used as a winger in a 4–3–3 system.

=== Later career ===
After scoring 24 goals in 58 matches, Helstad returned to Brann in June 2006. Since he transferred in the middle of the season he won both gold with Rosenborg and silver with Brann.

In July 2008, Brann accepted a €2 million bid for Helstad from French club Le Mans, where he was installed as their starting striker. Helstad scored 21 goals in 2010–11.

In June 2011, Helstad made a free transfer move to recently relegated and former Champions League finalist Monaco.

He announced his retirement from playing in April 2014.

== Career statistics ==
=== Club ===
Appearances and goals by club, season and competition
Season	Club	League			National cup		League cup		Europe		Total	
Season	Club	Division	Apps	Goals	Apps	Goals	Apps	Goals	Apps	Goals	Apps	Goals
HamKam	1995	Tippeligaen	17	4	0	0	—		—		17	4
HamKam	1996	Adeccoligaen	14	3	0	0	—		—		14	3
HamKam	1997	Adeccoligaen	15	5	0	0	—		—		15	5
HamKam	Total		46	12	0	0	0	0	0	0	46	12
Brann	1998	Tippeligaen	23	6	0	0	—		2	0	25	6
Brann	1999	Tippeligaen	21	8	0	0	—		—		21	8
Brann	2000	Tippeligaen	24	18	2	0	—		2	1	28	19
Brann	2001	Tippeligaen	23	17	4	3	—		2	0	29	20
Brann	2002	Tippeligaen	8	5	0	0	—		—		8	5
Brann	Total		99	54	6	3	0	0	6	1	111	58
Austria Wien	2002–03	Austrian Bundesliga	29	6	0	0	—		4	2	33	8
Austria Wien	2003–04	Austrian Bundesliga	27	6	0	0	—		2	0	29	6
Austria Wien	2004–05	Austrian Bundesliga	3	0	0	0	—		—		3	0
Austria Wien	Total		59	12	0	0	0	0	6	2	54	14
Rosenborg	2004	Tippeligaen	5	1	0	0	—		4	2	9	3
Rosenborg	2005	Tippeligaen	25	13	2	3	—		8	2	35	18
Rosenborg	2006	Tippeligaen	6	1	0	0	—		—		6	1
Rosenborg	Total		36	15	2	3	0	0	12	4	50	22
Brann	2006	Tippeligaen	12	2	1	0	—		—		13	2
Brann	2007	Tippeligaen	24	22	2	1	—		6	1	32	24
Brann	2008	Tippeligaen	12	11	1	2	—		2	0	15	13
Brann	Total		48	35	4	3	0	0	8	1	60	39
Le Mans	2008–09	Ligue 1	32	10	2	1	1	0	—		35	11
Le Mans	2009–10	Ligue 1	31	4	1	0	2	0	—		34	4
Le Mans	2010–11	Ligue 2	35	21	3	1	1	0	—		39	22
Le Mans	Total		98	35	6	2	4	0	0	0	108	37
Monaco	2011–12	Ligue 2	6	0	1	0	1	0	—		8	0
Lillestrøm	2012	Tippeligaen	12	3	0	0	—		—		12	3
Lillestrøm	2013	Tippeligaen	22	5	3	0	—		—		25	5
Lillestrøm	Total		34	8	3	0	0	0	0	0	37	8
Career total			426	171	22	11	5	0	32	8	485	190

=== International ===
Scores and results list Norway's goal tally first, score column indicates score after each Helstad goal.

List of international goals scored by Thorstein Helstad
No.	Date	Venue	Opponent	Score	Result	Competition
1	16 August 2000	Telia 5G -areena, Helsinki, Finland	Finland	1–1	1–3	Friendly
2	7 October 2000	Millennium Stadium, Cardiff, Wales	Wales	1–1	1–1	2002 FIFA World Cup qualification
3	24 January 2001	Hong Kong Stadium, Hong Kong	South Korea	2–1	3–2	Friendly
4	28 February 2001	Windsor Park, Belfast, Northern Ireland	Northern Ireland	1–0	4–0	Friendly
5.	28 February 2001	Windsor Park, Belfast, Northern Ireland	Northern Ireland	4–0	4–0	Friendly
6	26 January 2003	Sharjah Stadium, Sharjah, United Arab Emirates	United Arab Emirates	1–1	1–1	Friendly
7	8 June 2005	Råsunda Stadium, Solna, Sweden	Sweden	2–1	3–2	Friendly
8	12 October 2005	Ullevaal Stadion, Oslo, Norway	Belarus	1–0	1–0	2006 FIFA World Cup qualification
9	2 June 2007	Ullevaal Stadion, Oslo, Norway	Malta	2–0	4–0	UEFA Euro 2008 qualifying
10	9 September 2009	Ullevaal Stadion, Oslo, Norway	North Macedonia	1–0	2–1	2010 FIFA World Cup qualification

== Honours ==
Austria Wien

- Austrian Bundesliga: 2002–03
- Austrian Cup: 2002–03
- Austrian Supercup: 2003

Rosenborg

- Tippeligaen: 2004, 2006

Brann

- Tippeligaen: 2007

Individual

- Tippeligaen top scorer: 2000, 2001, 2007
- Kniksen Award Attacker of the Year: 2000, 2007
- Norwegian Football Association Gold Watch
