= Ronald Unger =

Austrian footballer

Personal information
- Date of birth: April 30, 1968 (age 58)
- Place of birth: Welgersdorf, Austria
- Height: 1.87 m (6 ft 2 in)
- Position: Goalkeeper

Senior career*
Years	Team	Apps	(Gls)
1987–1990	SC Eisenstadt		
1990–1991	Rapid Wien		
1991–1992	SC Eisenstadt		
1993–1995	First Vienna		
1995–1999	SV Ried	123	(0)
1992–2002	FC Kärnten	64	(0)
2003–2004	TSV Hartberg	3	(0)

Managerial career
- 2008–2010: TSV Hartberg (Goalkeeper coach)
- * Club domestic league appearances and goals

Ronald Unger (born April 30, 1968) is a retired Austrian football goalkeeper.

== Honours ==
- Austrian Cup winner: 2000-01
- Austrian Supercup winner: 2001
- Austrian Football First League winner: 2000-01
