= Friesenbichler =

Friesenbichler is a surname. Notable people with the surname include:

- Bruno Friesenbichler (born 1968), Austrian football player and manager
- Günter Friesenbichler (born 1979), Austrian football player
- Kevin Friesenbichler (born 1994), Austrian football player
