= Heimo Vorderegger =

Austrian footballer and manager

Personal information
- Date of birth: 3 July 1966 (age 60)
- Place of birth: Villach, Austria
- Height: 1.80 m (5 ft 11 in)
- Position: Defender

Senior career*
Years	Team	Apps	(Gls)
1985–1989	Austria Klagenfurt	72	(9)
1989–1996	VSE St. Pölten	114	(10)
1996–2004	FC Kärnten	164	(26)
2004	BSV Bad Bleiberg	6	(0)
2004–2006	FC Alpe Adria		
2006–2007	SK Maria Saal		
2007–2008	SC Keutschach		
2008–2009	SK Maria Saal		

Managerial career
- 2009–2010: FC St. Veit
- 2012–2013: SK Austria Klagenfurt (assistant manager)
- 2013: SK Austria Klagenfurt
- * Club domestic league appearances and goals

Heimo Vorderegger (born 3 June 1966) is a football manager and former Austrian football defender.

== Honours ==
- Austrian Cup winner: 2000-01
- Austrian Supercup winner: 2001
- Austrian Football First League winner: 2000-01
