= 2002–03 Austrian Cup =

Tournament details
- Country: Austria

Final positions
- Champions: Austria Vienna
- Runners-up: FC Kärnten

Tournament statistics
- Top goal scorer: Thomas Ambrosius (4)

The 2002–03 Austrian Cup (German: ÖFB-Cup) was the 69th season of Austria's nationwide football cup competition. It commenced with the matches of the First Round in August 2002 and concluded with the Final on 1 June 2003. The competition was won by Austria Vienna after beating FC Kärnten 3–2. Due to Austria Vienna qualifying for European competition through winning the Bundesliga, Kärnten qualified for the 2003–04 UEFA Cup as cup runners-up.

== First round ==
Team 1	Score	Team 2
27 August 2002
ASK Klagenfurt/FC Kärnten Amateure	1–3	SC Untersiebenbrunn
ASK Kottingbrunn	3–1	Floridsdorfer AC
ATSV Sattledt	0–2	Wiener Sport-Club
FK Austria Wien Amateure	0–1	SV Austria Salzburg
FC Blau-Weiß Linz	3–1	LASK Linz
SK Eintracht Wels	0–6	Kapfenberger SV
FC Gratkorn	1–4 (a.e.t.)	SV Wörgl
FC Kufstein	0–2	BSV Bad Bleiberg
FC Puch	1–0 (a.e.t.)	SV Rohrbach
FC Zeltweg	2–1 (a.e.t.)	SV Neuberg
Fortuna 05 Wien	0–1	SPG Wattens/Wacker Tirol
Kremser SC	2–5	VfB Admira/Wacker Mödling
SC Rheindorf Altach	4–3 (a.e.t.)	ASKÖ Pasching
SC Schwanenstadt	0–1	SK Rapid Wien
SK St. Andrä	1–6	Schwarz-Weiß Bregenz
SKN St. Pölten	1–3	SC Austria Lustenau
SV Austria Salzburg Amateure	1–2	SV Mattersburg
SV Hall	3–1	FC St. Veit
SV Horn	1–4	SV Ried
SV Hundsheim	0–2	DSV Leoben
SV Langenrohr	1–1 (a.e.t.) (5–3 p)	Gersthofer SV
SVL Flavia Solva	1–2	FC Lustenau
TUS FC Arnfels	1–0	PSV/Schwarz Weiß Salzburg
Union St. Florian	0–6	TSV Hartberg

== Second round ==
Team 1	Score	Team 2
24 September 2002
ASK Kottingbrunn	0–1 (a.e.t.)	SC Untersiebenbrunn
FC Blau-Weiß Linz	3–1	Kapfenberger SV
FC Zeltweg	0–4	FC Lustenau
SC Rheindorf Altach	3–1	VfB Admira/Wacker Mödling
SPG Wattens/Wacker Tirol	4–0	SC Austria Lustenau
SV Hall	1–5	SV Ried
SV Langenrohr	1–9	SV Mattersburg
Wiener Sport-Club	3–2	DSV Leoben
25 September 2002
BSV Bad Bleiberg	2–0	SK Rapid Wien
TSV Hartberg	3–3 (a.e.t.) (4–1 p)	Schwarz-Weiß Bregenz
1 October 2002
FC Puch	0–2	SV Austria Salzburg
9 October 2002
TUS FC Arnfels	2–0	SV Wörgl

== Third round ==
Team 1	Score	Team 2
18 March 2003
FC Blau-Weiß Linz	0–3 (a.e.t.)	FC Kärnten
SC Rheindorf Altach	0–1	SV Austria Salzburg
SC Untersiebenbrunn	1–2 (a.e.t.)	SV Ried
SPG Wattens/Wacker Tirol	5–3 (a.e.t.)	FC Lustenau
SK Sturm Graz	3–0	Wiener Sport-Club
TSV Hartberg	0–1	SV Mattersburg
19 March 2003
BSV Bad Bleiberg	0–2	FK Austria Wien
TUS FC Arnfels	0–4	Grazer AK

== Quarter-finals ==
8 April 2003	FK Austria Wien	1–0	SK Sturm Graz	Wien
19:30	Janocko 45'	Report		Stadium: Franz-Horr-Stadion; Attendance: 3,100; Referee: Dietmar Drabek

8 April 2003	SPG Wattens/Wacker Tirol	0–2	SV Austria Salzburg	Innsbruck
19:00		Report	Pfeifenberger 30'; Laessig 37'	Stadium: Tivoli; Attendance: 11,000; Referee: Stefan Meßner

8 April 2003	SV Ried	1–3	FC Kärnten	Ried im Innkreis
19:00	Steininger 41'	Report	Maric 44'; Ambrosius 49'; Bubalo 88'	Stadium: Stadion der Stadt Ried; Attendance: 2,000; Referee: Thomas Steiner

8 April 2003	SV Mattersburg	1–0	Grazer AK	Mattersburg
19:15	Sabitzer 18'	Report		Stadium: Pappelstadion; Attendance: 17,600; Referee: Fritz Stuchlik

== Semi-finals ==
13 May 2003	FC Kärnten	4–0	SV Mattersburg	Klagenfurt
19:00	Ambrosius 25', 35'; Jovanovic 75'; Bubalo 89'	Report		Stadium: Wörthersee Stadion; Attendance: 10,000; Referee: Bernhard Brugger

13 May 2003	SV Austria Salzburg	0–1 (a.e.t.)	FK Austria Wien	Salzburg
18:00		Report	Eder 37' (o.g.)	Stadium: Stadion Wals-Siezenheim, Attendance: 17,000; Referee: Konrad Plautz

== Final ==
1 June 2003
16:30

Austria Wien	3–0	FC Kärnten
Janočko 15'; Rushfeldt 47', 87'	Report

Arnold Schwarzenegger-Stadion, Graz
Attendance: 6,500
Referee: Thomas Steiner
