= Gerard Aichorn =

Austrian footballer (born 1953)

Personal information
- Date of birth: 19 December 1953 (age 72)
- Place of birth: Austria
- Positions: Defender; midfielder

Senior career*
Years	Team	Apps	(Gls)
-1972	Leerdam Sport '55		
1972-1974	FC Den Bosch		
1974-1975	SK Austria Klagenfurt		
1975-1977	SK Rapid Wien		
-1988	FC Den Bosch	126+	(3+)
- * Club domestic league appearances and goals

Gerard Aichorn (born 19 December 1953) is an Austrian retired footballer.
