= Almedin Hota =

Bosnian retired professional footballer (born 1976)

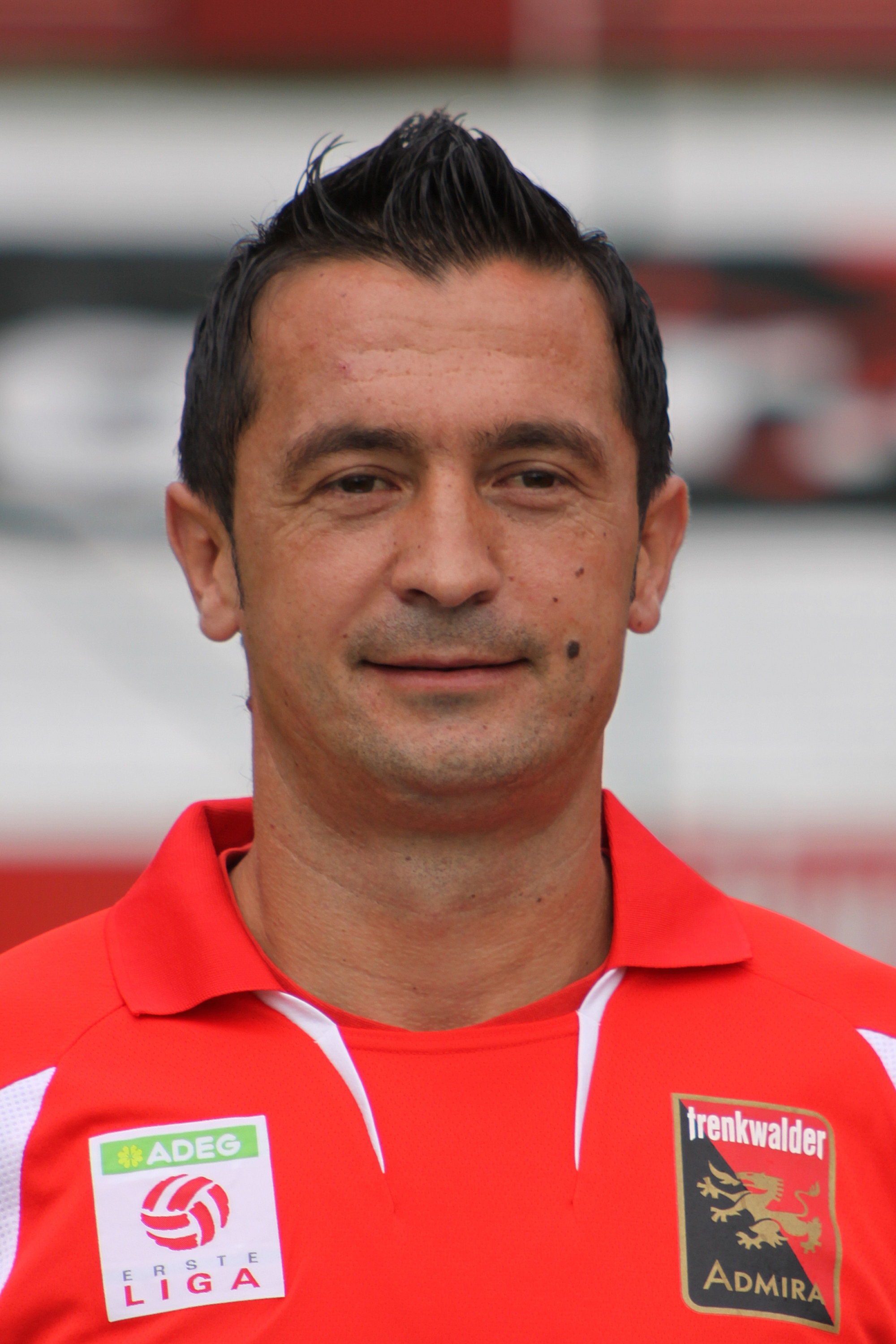
- Hota with Admira Wacker in July 2009

Personal information
- Full name: Almedin Hota
- Date of birth: 22 July 1976 (age 50)
- Place of birth: Sarajevo, SFR Yugoslavia
- Height: 1.78 m (5 ft 10 in)
- Position: Midfielder

Youth career
- Željezničar

Senior career*
Years	Team	Apps	(Gls)
1995–1996	Olimpik	26	(3)
1996–1999	Bosna Visoko	79	(20)
1999–2000	Sarajevo	28	(9)
2000–2006	Kärnten	192	(23)
2006–2008	LASK	59	(4)
2008–2009	Admira Wacker	31	(3)
2010	Aluminium Hormozgan	20	(2)
2010–2011	Welzenegg	14	(0)
2011–2012	Austria Klagenfurt	28	(2)
2012–2013	Bleiburg	25	(6)
2013–2017	Annabichler	74	(3)
Total		556	(73)

International career
1996-1997	Bosnia U-21	6	(1)
1998–2002	Bosnia and Herzegovina	22	(3)
- * Club domestic league appearances and goals

Almedin Hota (born 22 July 1976 in Sarajevo) is a Bosnian retired professional footballer. He still plays amateur football and futsal, in Klagenfurt though.

== International career ==
He made his debut for Bosnia and Herzegovina in a May 1998 friendly match away against Argentina and has earned a total of 22 caps, scoring 3 goals. His final international was an October 2002 friendly against Germany.

== Career statistics ==
=== International ===
National team	Year	Apps	Goals
Bosnia and Herzegovina
Bosnia and Herzegovina	1998	1	0
Bosnia and Herzegovina	1999	1	0
Bosnia and Herzegovina	2000	2	0
Bosnia and Herzegovina	2001	14	3
Bosnia and Herzegovina	2002	3	0
Total		21	3

Scores and results list Bosnia and Herzegovina's goal tally first, score column indicates score after each Hota goal.

List of international goals scored by Almedin Hota
No.	Date	Venue	Opponent	Score	Result	Competition
1	12 January 2001	Jawaharlal Nehru Stadium, Kochi, India	Bangladesh	1–0	2–0	Millennium Super Soccer Cup
2	12 January 2001	Jawaharlal Nehru Stadium, Kochi, India	Bangladesh	2–0	2–0	Millennium Super Soccer Cup
3	28 March 2001	Rheinpark Stadion, Vaduz, Liechtenstein	Liechtenstein	3–0	3–0	2002 FIFA World Cup qualification

== Honours ==
=== Player ===
Bosna Visoko

- Bosnian Cup: 1998–99

Kärnten

- Austrian Football Second League: 2000–01
- Austrian Cup: 2000–01
- Austrian Supercup: 2001

LASK

- Austrian Football Second League: 2006–07
