= Stipe Brnas =

Croatian footballer (born 1969)

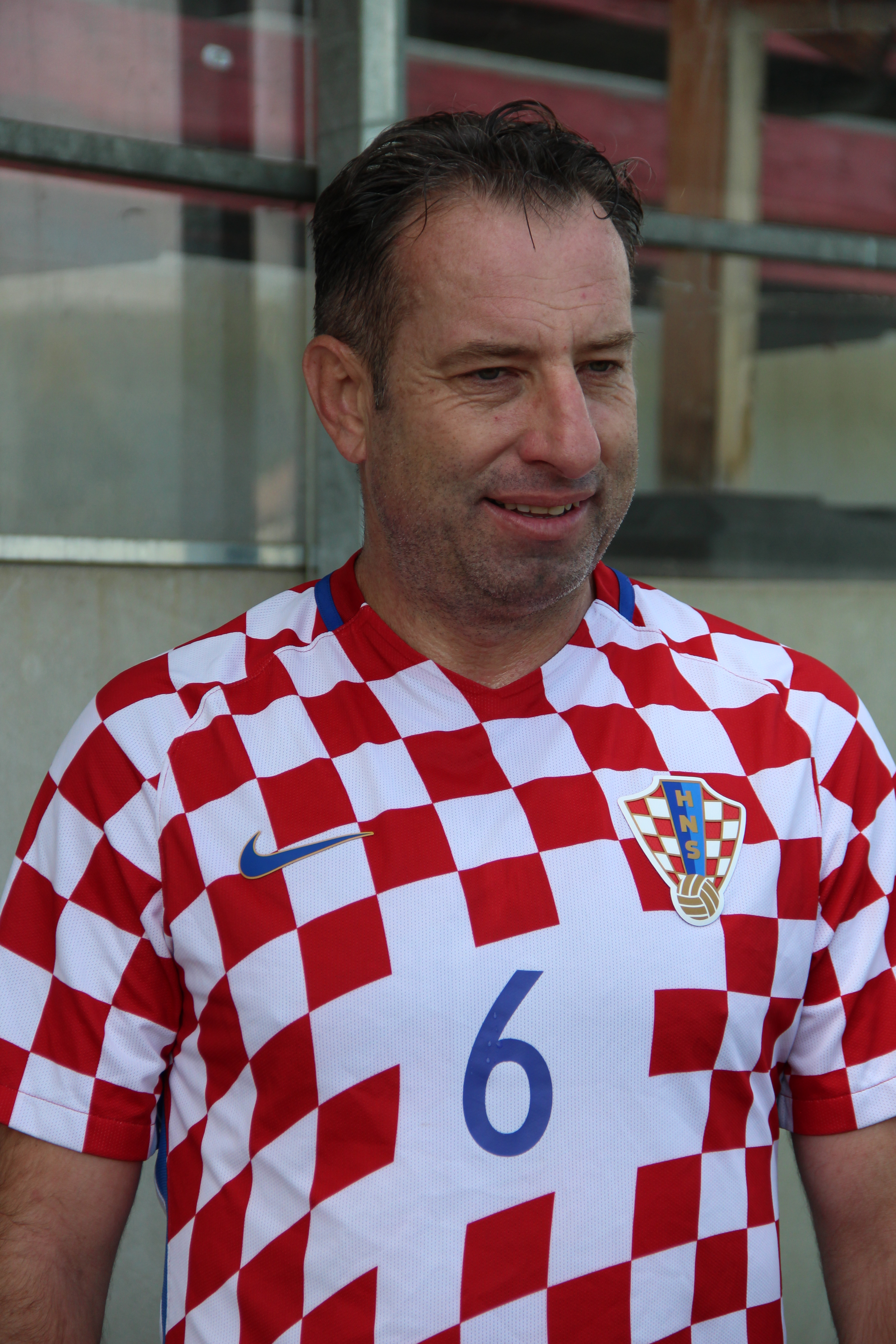

Personal information
- Date of birth: September 26, 1969 (age 57)
- Place of birth: Ričice,
- Height: 1.85 m (6 ft 1 in)
- Position: Defender

Senior career*
Years	Team	Apps	(Gls)
1992–1993	INKER	36	(5)
1993–1996	Segesta	101	(6)
1996–1999	Grazer AK	46	(1)
1999–2001	FC Kärnten	46	(1)
2001	Hrvatski Dragovoljac	2	(0)
2001–2002	1. FC Saarbrücken	20	(1)
2002–2004	Inter Zaprešić	32	(1)
2004–2006	NK Zagreb	35	(0)
2006–2007	Inter Zaprešić	12	(0)

Managerial career
- 2008: Inter Zaprešić (assistant)
- 2009: Rudeš
- 2018: HAŠK
- 2018-2019: Špansko
- 2021: Špansko
- * Club domestic league appearances and goals

Stipe Brnas (born September 26, 1969) is a retired Croatian football defender, who currently is a coach at the NK Trnje academy.

== Honours ==
- Austrian Cup winner: 2000-01
- Austrian Football First League winner: 2000-01
