= Ronald Brunmayr =

Austrian footballer

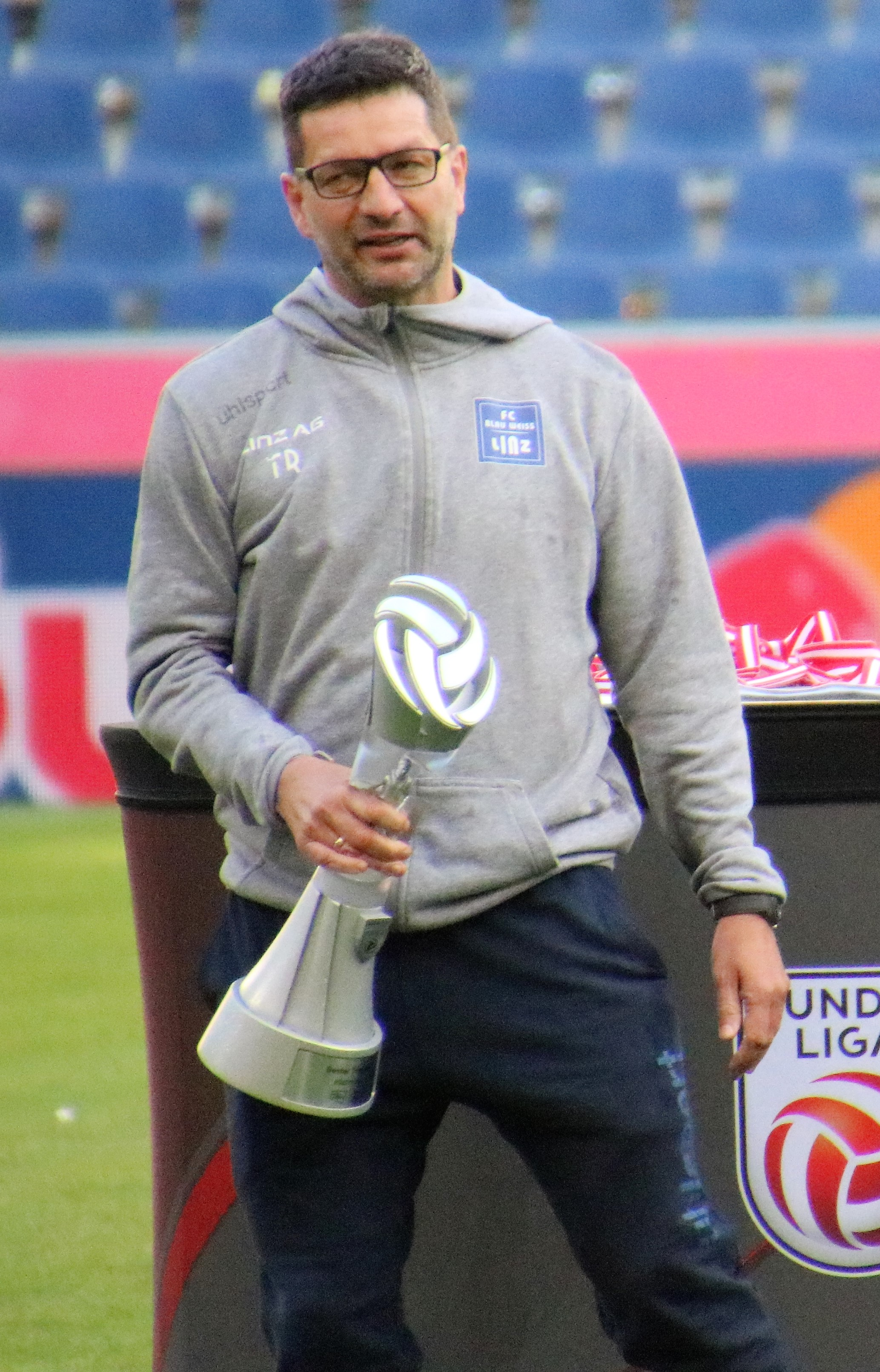

Personal information
- Date of birth: 17 February 1975 (age 51)
- Place of birth: Steyr, Austria
- Height: 1.77 m (5 ft 10 in)
- Position: Striker

Team information
- Current team: Crystal Palace (coach)

Youth career
- SV Garsten
- Vorwärts Steyr

Senior career*
Years	Team	Apps	(Gls)
1994–1995	Linz	31	(5)
1996–1998	Austria Wien	63	(12)
1998–2000	SV Ried	62	(20)
2000–2003	Grazer AK	92	(50)
2003–2005	Sturm Graz	40	(6)
2005–2007	SV Ried	21	(4)
2007	Kärnten	16	(4)
2008–2010	Pasching	44	(38)

International career
2000–2003	Austria	8	(1)

Managerial career
- 2015–2018: Juniors OÖ
- 2020–2021: Blau-Weiß Linz
- * Club domestic league appearances and goals

Ronald Brunmayr (born 17 February 1975) is an Austrian football manager and a former player who is currently a first-team coach at Premier League club Crystal Palace.

== Club career ==
In August 1994, Brunmayr started his professional career with FC Linz, making his Bundesliga debut, and was signed by Vienna club Austria Wien in 1996.

In 1998, after two years he moved to SV Ried, and again two years later, in 2000 he moved to Grazer AK, with whom he won a domestic cup, became footballer of the year, and topped Austria's goalscoring charts.

He then joined Sturm Graz in 2003, then rejoined SV Ried later in 2005, and played for FC Kärnten in 2007, before finishing his professional career at SV Pasching from 2008 to 2010.

== International career ==
In the U21 European Championships, Ronald Brunmayr, whilst playing Scotland on 30th August 1996, he scored 2 excellent goals and was a constant thorn in the side of the Scottish defence, especially Ian McConnell who ended up getting substituted at half time as a result.

In August 2000, Brunmayr made his debut for the Austria national team against Hungary, and earned eight caps, scoring one goal.

His final international game was a March 2003 friendly match against Scotland.

== Coaching career ==
From 2012 to 2015, Brunmayr managed academy teams of LASK. In the summer of 2015, he became coach of FC Juniors OÖ and later the LASK under-19 team. In 2018, he was promoted to the 2nd league with the Juniors.

During the winter break of the 2018–19 season, Brunmayr returned to LASK. The following season he went back to the Juniors as assistant coach to Gerald Scheiblehner. In January 2020, he became the coach of FC Blau-Weiß Linz. In the 2020–21 season they won the championship title in the Second league. Brunmayr left Blau-Weiß for the 2021–22 season and became Oliver Glasner's assistant coach in Germany at Bundesliga club Eintracht Frankfurt. They won the 2021–22 UEFA Europa League with Frankfurt in the final on 18 May 2022. In 2023 he left Frankfurt together with Glasner.

On 19 February 2024, Brunmayr linked up with Glasner again, becoming assistant manager at Premier League club Crystal Palace.

== International goals ==
Scores and results list Austria's goal tally first.

No	Date	Venue	Opponent	Score	Result	Competition
1.	27 March 2002	Merkur-Arena, Graz, Austria	Slovakia	1–0	2–0	Friendly match

== Career statistics ==
Appearances and goals by national team and year
National team	Year	Apps	Goals
Austria	2000	3	0
Austria	2001	2	0
Austria	2002	2	1
Austria	2003	1	0
Total		8	1

== Honours ==
Grazer AK

- Austrian Cup: 2001–02

Individual

- Austrian Bundesliga top scorer: 2001–02
