= Roman Stary =

Austrian footballer

Personal information
- Date of birth: December 18, 1973 (age 52)
- Place of birth: Vienna, Austria
- Height: 1.68 m (5 ft 6 in)
- Position: Midfielder

Youth career
- 1989–1992: Rapid Wien

Senior career*
Years	Team	Apps	(Gls)
1992–1994	SK Rapid Wien	3	(0)
1994	Favoritner AC	2	(0)
1994–1995	Grazer AK	20	(2)
1995–1996	SC Fürstenfeld		
1996–1997	SR Donaufeld	5	(3)
1997–1998	ASK Kottingbrunn	14	(3)
1998	TSV Hartberg	14	(6)
1998–1999	First Vienna FC	36	(21)
1999–2000	FK Austria Wien	7	(0)
2000–2003	FC Kärnten	86	(13)
2003–2004	FC Wacker Innsbruck	26	(4)
2004–2006	FC Kärnten	15	(2)

Managerial career
- 2021–: Wolfsberger AC (caretaker manager)
- * Club domestic league appearances and goals

Roman Stary (born December 18, 1973) is a retired Austrian football midfielder who is currently the caretaker manager of Wolfsberger AC.

== Honours ==
- Austrian Cup winner: 2000-01
- Austrian Supercup winner: 2001
- Austrian Football First League winner: 2000-01, 2003–04
