= Jürgen Kampel =

Austrian footballer

Personal information
- Date of birth: 28 January 1981 (age 45)
- Place of birth: Klagenfurt, Austria
- Height: 1.83 m (6 ft 0 in)
- Position: Midfielder

Youth career
- 1990–1996: DSG Klopeinersee
- 1996–1998: FC Kärnten

Senior career*
Years	Team	Apps	(Gls)
1998–2001	FC Kärnten	54	(0)
2001–2003	FC Untersiebenbrunn	62	(3)
2003–2007	FC Kärnten	110	(6)
2007–2013	SC Austria Lustenau	188	(26)
2013–2014	SC Tisis		

International career
1999–2003	Austria U21	15	(0)
- * Club domestic league appearances and goals

Jürgen Kampel (born 28 January 1981) is a retired Austrian football midfielder.

== Honours ==
- Austrian Cup winner: 2000-01
- Austrian Football First League winner: 2000-01
