= Gerhard Breitenberger =

Gerhard Breitenberger may refer to:

- Gerhard Breitenberger (footballer, born 1954), Austrian footballer
- Gerhard Breitenberger (footballer, born 1979), Austrian footballer
