= Markus Aigner =

German footballer

Personal information
- Date of birth: 4 January 1972 (age 54)
- Place of birth: Germany
- Height: 1.85 m (6 ft 1 in)
- Position: Midfielder

Senior career*
Years	Team	Apps	(Gls)
1996–1997	FC Augsburg	24	(3)
1997–1998	SV Wacker Burghausen	15	(1)
1998	SG Post/Süd Regensburg	12	(0)
1998–2000	Austria Klagenfurt	48	(5)
2000–2004	FC Untersiebenbrunn	93	(26)
2004–2005	SKN St. Pölten	40	(19)
2005–2007	DSV Leoben	53	(22)
2007	FK Austria Wien II	11	(2)
2007–2008	SV Würmla	25	(7)
2008–2009	Floridsdorfer AC	13	(6)
2009–2010	ASK Baumgarten	14	(4)
2010	Rennweger SV 1901	11	(5)
2010	SC Wiesen		
2010–2011	Rennweger SV 1901		
2012–2014	SV Strasshof		
2014–2015	1. SV Wiener Neudorf		
2015–2016	SV Strasshof		
2016	Mauerwerk	7	(1)
- * Club domestic league appearances and goals

Markus Aigner (born 4 January 1972) is a German retired footballer who played as a midfielder.
