= Kai Schoppitsch =

Austrian footballer

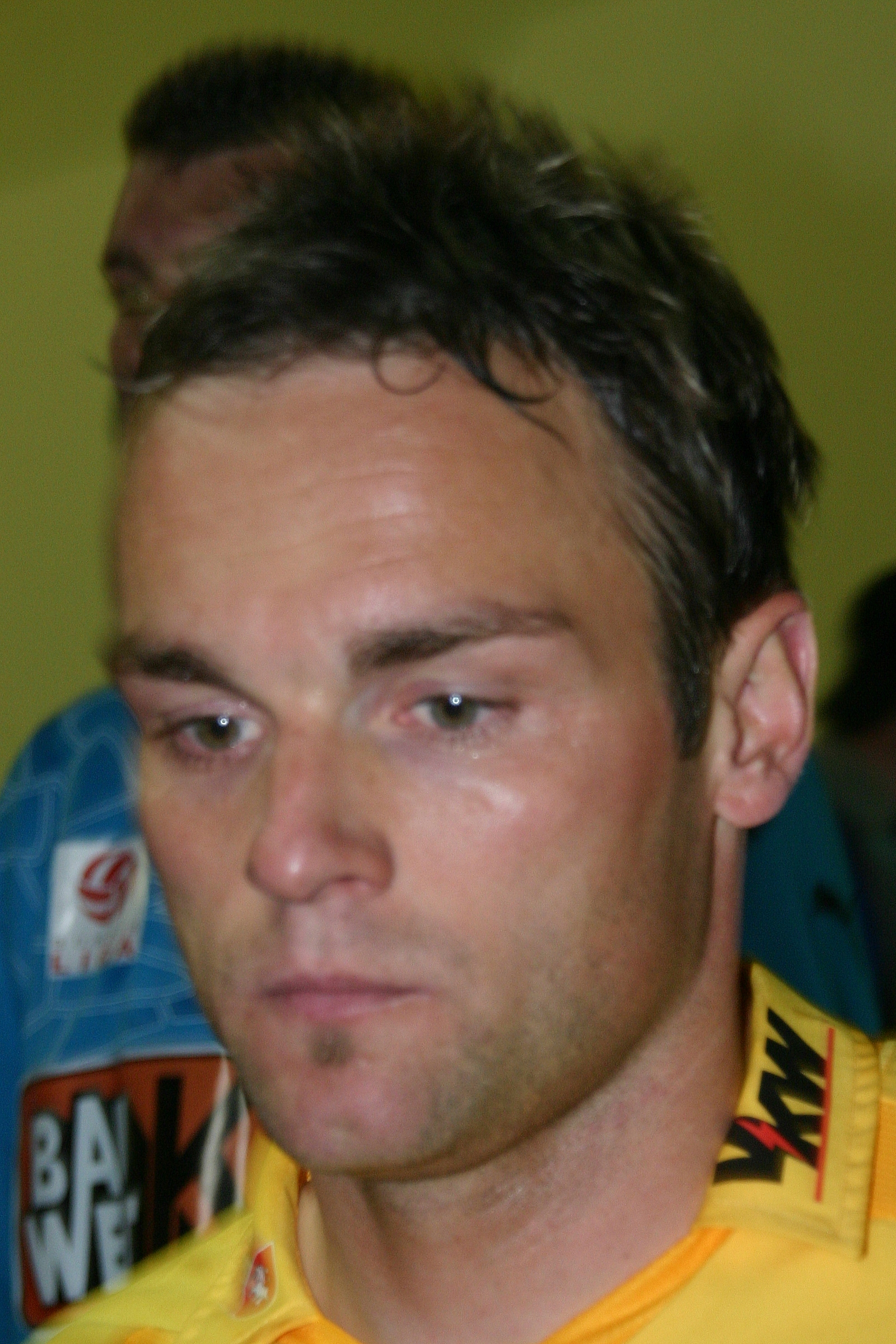

Personal information
- Full name: Kai Walter Schoppitsch
- Date of birth: 2 May 1980 (age 46)
- Place of birth: Wolfsberg, Austria
- Height: 1.75 m (5 ft 9 in)
- Position: Midfielder

Team information
- Current team: SV Austria Klagenfurt

Youth career
- 1995–2001: FC Kärnten

Senior career*
Years	Team	Apps	(Gls)
2001–2002	SK Austria Kärnten	27	(0)
2002–2004	Red Bull Salzburg	40	(1)
2004–2006	SK Austria Karnten	51	(1)
2006–2009	SC Rheindorf Altach	77	(11)
2009–2010	First Vienna	21	(3)
2010–	SV Austria Klagenfurt		
- * Club domestic league appearances and goals

Kai Walter Schoppitsch (born 2 May 1980 in Wolfsberg) is an Austrian football player currently playing for SV Austria Klagenfurt.

== Career ==
Schoppitsch was raised in Klagenfurt, and began playing professional football with local side SK Austria Kärnten where he appeared in the Austrian Football Bundesliga. He also played in the Bundesliga for SC Rheindorf Altach before suffering a long-term injury in early 2008. He returned from his injury in the First League with First Vienna.
