= Thomas Ambrosius =

Danish footballer (born 1969)

Personal information
- Date of birth: 4 July 1969 (age 56)
- Place of birth: Denmark
- Position: Striker

Senior career*
Years	Team	Apps	(Gls)
–1993	Viborg FF	13	(2)
1994–1995	Aarhus Gymnastikforening	11	(3)
1995–1999	BK Herning Fremad		
1999–2000	FC Midtjylland		
2000–2001	Schwarz-Weiß Bregenz	34	(14)
2001–2003	FC Kärnten	79	(11)
2004	BSV Bad Bleiberg	11	(2)
2004–2005	Lyngby BK		
- * Club domestic league appearances and goals

Thomas Ambrosius (born 4 July 1969) is a Danish former footballer who played as a striker.

== Early life ==
Ambrosius was born in 1969 in Denmark. He is a native of Jutland, Denmark.

== Career ==
Ambrosius started his career with Danish side Viborg FF. In 1994, he signed for Danish side Aarhus Gymnastikforening. In 1995, he signed for Danish side BK Herning Fremad. In 1999, he signed for Danish side FC Midtjylland. In 2000, he signed for Austrian side Schwarz-Weiß Bregenz. He was regarded as one of the club's most important players. In 2001, he signed for Austrian side FC Kärnten. In 2004, he signed for Austrian side BSV Bad Bleiberg. After that, he signed for Danish side Lyngby BK. He retired from professional football at the age of thirty-six.

== Personal life ==
Ambrosius has been married. He has a daughter and a son.
