= 2002–03 Austrian Football Bundesliga =

85th season of top-tier football league in Austria

Austrian Bundesliga
- Season: 2002–03
- Champions: FK Austria Wien
- Matches: 180
- Goals: 467 (2.59 per match)

Statistics of Austrian Football Bundesliga in the 2002–03 season.

== Overview ==
It was contested by 10 teams, and FK Austria Wien won the championship.

== Participating teams ==
Location of teams in the 2002–03 Austrian Football Bundesliga

Club	City
Austria Wien	Vienna
Grazer AK	Graz
Austria Salzburg	Salzburg
Rapid Wien	Vienna
ASKÖ Pasching	Pasching
Sturm Graz	Graz
Admira Wacker Mödling	Mödling
FC Kärnten	Klagenfurt
SW Bregenz	Bregenz
SV Ried	Ried im Innkreis

== League standings ==
Pos	Team	Pld	W	D	L	GF	GA	GD	Pts	Qualification or relegation
1	Austria Wien (C)	36	21	7	8	59	28	+31	70	Qualification to Champions League third qualifying round
2	Grazer AK	36	15	12	9	56	39	+17	57	Qualification to Champions League second qualifying round
3	Austria Salzburg	36	15	11	10	51	46	+5	56	Qualification to UEFA Cup first round
4	Rapid Wien	36	13	12	11	40	38	+2	51	
5	Pasching	36	13	10	13	41	37	+4	49	Qualification to Intertoto Cup first round
6	Sturm Graz	36	14	5	17	50	62	−12	47	
7	Admira Wacker Mödling	36	11	11	14	36	46	−10	44	
8	Kärnten	36	11	8	17	45	57	−12	41	Qualification to UEFA Cup qualifying round (Note: Champions League-bound Austria Wien won the 2002–03 Austrian Cup, so cup runners-up Kärnten will enter the qualifying round of UEFA Cup.)
9	Bregenz	36	9	12	15	48	58	−10	39	
10	Ried (R)	36	10	8	18	41	56	−15	38	Relegation to Austrian First Football League

Source: weltfussball.de (in German)
Rules for classification: 1) points; 2) goal difference; 3) number of goals scored.
(C) Champions; (R) Relegated

== Results ==
Teams played each other four times in the league. In the first half of the season each team played every other team twice (home and away), and then did the same in the second half of the season.

=== First half of season ===
Home \ Away	ADM	ASZ	AWI	BRE	GAK	KÄR	PAS	RWI	RIE	STU
Admira Wacker Mödling		1–0	0–3	2–2	2–2	0–3	3–1	0–0	1–1	0–3
Austria Salzburg	2–0		0–4	1–3	1–1	0–0	3–2	3–1	1–3	1–2
Austria Wien	2–1	0–0		3–1	3–0	3–1	3–0	1–1	2–0	4–0
Bregenz	2–2	0–0	0–1		2–2	2–1	2–2	0–1	1–1	3–0
Grazer AK	2–3	0–1	0–4	2–0		2–0	0–2	2–0	2–0	2–1
Kärnten	4–1	0–1	1–1	3–0	1–1		2–0	0–3	3–0	2–2
Pasching	2–0	1–0	3–1	0–0	1–1	3–0		2–0	1–1	2–0
Rapid Wien	1–2	2–2	1–2	2–1	1–1	2–0	1–0		0–0	1–2
Ried	2–0	4–0	1–1	1–1	1–0	3–0	0–1	3–1		1–2
Sturm Graz	3–0	3–1	0–2	3–0	1–1	1–3	1–3	0–4	2–0	

Source: weltfussball.de (in German)
Legend: Blue = home team win; Yellow = draw; Red = away team win.

=== Second half of season ===
Home \ Away	ADM	ASZ	AWI	BRE	GAK	KÄR	PAS	RWI	RIE	STU
Admira Wacker Mödling		1–1	1–2	1–0	0–2	4–0	1–0	0–1	0–1	2–1
Austria Salzburg	0–0		1–0	4–1	1–1	1–1	3–0	2–0	5–2	2–1
Austria Wien	0–2	1–0		0–2	2–1	0–3	0–1	0–0	2–0	1–2
Bregenz	0–1	5–1	1–2		2–1	1–2	2–1	3–6	2–0	0–2
Grazer AK	1–1	3–3	1–2	4–1		3–0	2–0	0–0	2–0	2–1
Kärnten	0–0	0–3	1–3	2–2	1–2		0–1	1–0	4–1	3–1
Pasching	0–0	0–1	0–0	1–1	0–2	1–1		3–0	3–0	2–3
Rapid Wien	0–0	0–2	1–1	1–1	0–0	2–1	2–1		3–2	1–0
Ried	0–3	1–2	1–0	1–3	1–3	5–0	0–0	0–0		2–1
Sturm Graz	2–1	2–2	0–3	1–1	0–5	2–1	1–1	0–1	4–2	

Source: weltfussball.de (in German)
Legend: Blue = home team win; Yellow = draw; Red = away team win.

== Top goalscorers ==
Rank	Scorer	Club	Goals
1	(Belgium) Axel Lawarée	SW Bregenz	21
2	(Austria) Eduard Glieder	ASKÖ Pasching	16
2	(Croatia) Marijo Marić	FC Kärnten	16
4	(Slovakia) Vladimír Janočko	Austria Wien	12
5	(Poland) Radosław Gilewicz	Austria Wien	11
5	(Hungary) Imre Szabics	Sturm Graz	11
5	(Austria) Roman Wallner	Rapid Wien	11
8	(Austria) Muhammet Akagündüz	SV Ried	10
9	(Austria) Roland Kirchler	Austria Salzburg	9
9	(Hungary) László Klausz	SW Bregenz	9

== Attendances ==
#	Club	Average
1	Salzburg	7,514
2	Sturm	7,374
3	GAK	6,919
4	Austria	6,200
5	Rapid	5,850
6	Kärnten	5,754
7	Bregenz	5,104
8	Pasching	3,813
9	Ried	2,892
10	Admira	1,432
