= Bruno Friesenbichler =

Austrian footballer and manager

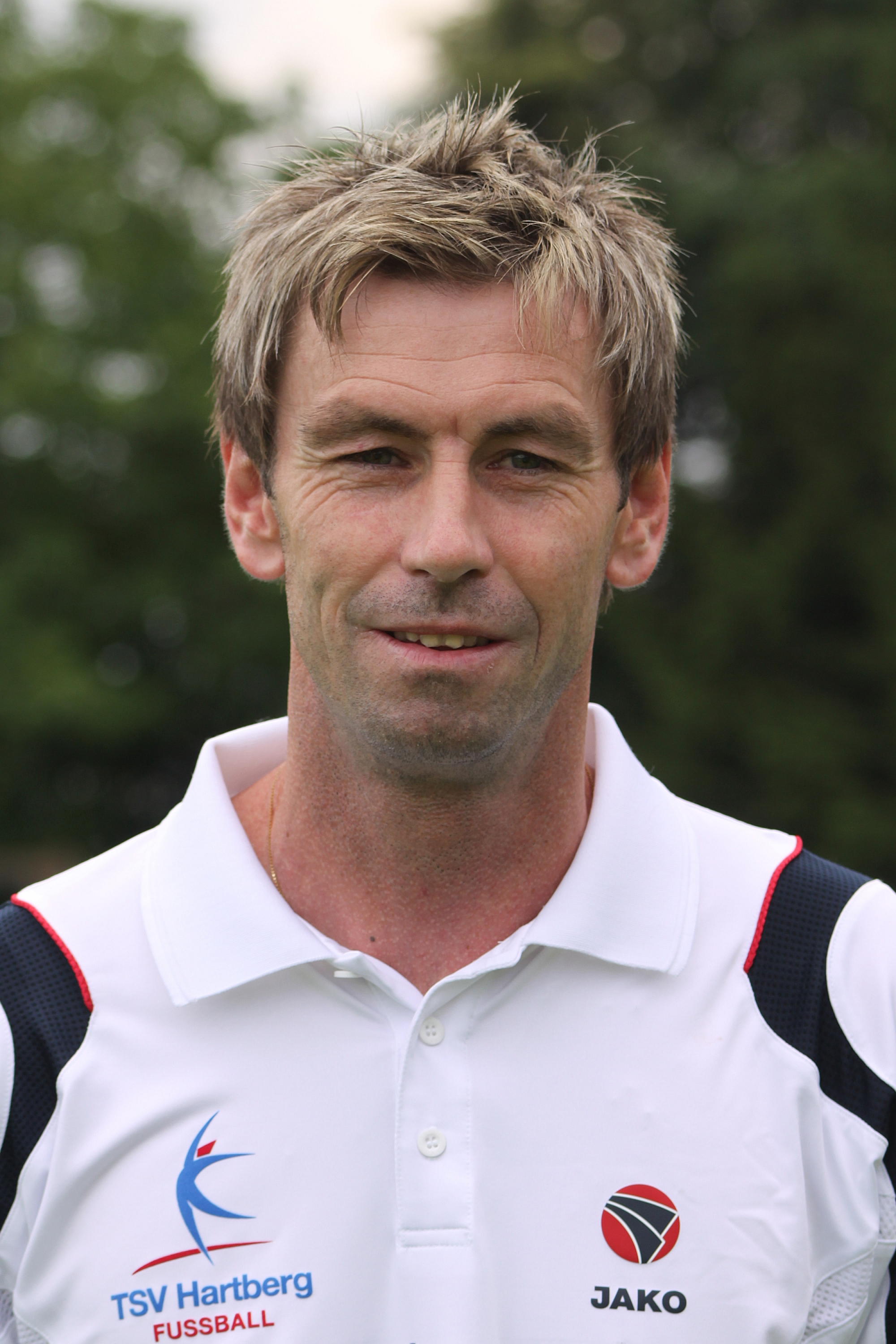
- Friesenbichler in 2009

Personal information
- Date of birth: 30 March 1968 (age 58)
- Place of birth: Austria
- Height: 1.90 m (6 ft 3 in)
- Position: Forward

Youth career
- –1991: FC Großklein

Senior career*
Years	Team	Apps	(Gls)
1991–1992	First Vienna FC	10	(1)
1992–1993	SV Leibnitz Flavia Solva		
1993–1995	Sturm Graz	49	(12)
1995–1996	SV Leibnitz Flavia Solva	6	(1)
1996	Grazer AK		
1996–1997	First Vienna FC	17	(5)
1997–2000	Schwarz-Weiß Bregenz	56	(11)
2000–2001	FC Kärnten	21	(5)
2001–2002	FC Lustenau 07	16	(2)
2002–2003	DSV Leoben	17	(3)
2003–2004	SV Ried	15	(1)
2004–2006	SC Weiz		

Managerial career
- 2006–2007: FC Großklein
- 2007–2011: TSV Hartberg
- 2012–2013: SK Austria Klagenfurt
- 2013–2014: TSV Hartberg
- 2014–2015: TSV Hartberg
- 2016–2018: SC Weiz
- * Club domestic league appearances and goals

Bruno Friesenbichler (born 30 March 1968) is an Austrian football manager and former player who played as a striker.

He is the father of footballers Kevin Friesenbichler and Robin Friesenbichler, and the brother of retired footballer Günter Friesenbichler.

== Honours ==
- Austrian Cup: 2000-01
- Austrian Football First League: 1998-99, 2000–01
