= Markus Scharrer =

Austrian footballer

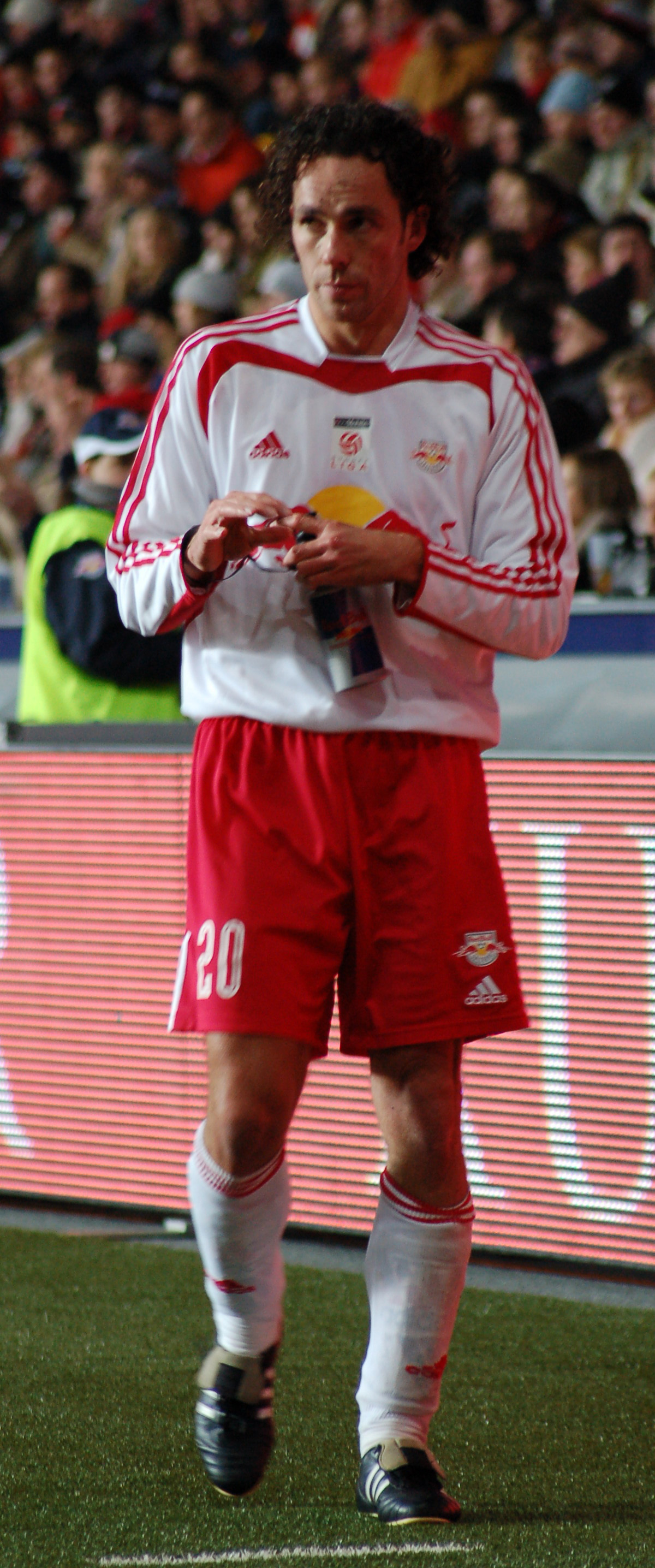

Personal information
- Full name: Markus Scharrer
- Date of birth: 3 July 1974 (age 52)
- Place of birth: Mödling, Austria
- Height: 1.83 m (6 ft 0 in)
- Position: Midfielder

Senior career*
| Years | Team | Apps | (Gls) |
| 1992–1996 | Admira Wacker | 86 | (9) |
| 1996–1998 | LASK Linz | 30 | (3) |
| 1998 | Ried | 17 | (6) |
| 1998–2002 | Wacker Innsbruck | 116 | (18) |
| 2002–2003 | Wörgl | 11 | (3) |
| 2003–2005 | Austria Salzburg | 50 | (5) |
| 2005–2006 | Red Bull Salzburg | 15 | (2) |
| 2006–2009 | Admira Wacker | 29 | (10) |
| 2009–2010 | Kapfenberg | 10 | (2) |
| 2010–2013 | Seekirchen | 46 | (5) |
| 2013 | USK Obertrum | | |
| 2013 | USK Anif | | |
| Total | | 410 | (63) |

International career
| | Austria U-21 | 3 | (1) |

Managerial career
- 2011–2012: SV Seekirchen
- * Club domestic league appearances and goals

Markus Scharrer (born 3 July 1974) is an Austrian former professional footballer.
