= Johann Kogler =

Austrian footballer

Personal information
- Date of birth: 12 May 1968 (age 58)
- Place of birth: Judenburg, Austria
- Height: 1.85 m (6 ft 1 in)
- Positions: Midfielder; defender

Senior career*
Years	Team	Apps	(Gls)
1989–1991	Grazer AK		
1991–1993	Vorwärts Steyr	56	(6)
1993–1994	→ Admira Wacker (loan)	24	(1)
1994–1996	Admira Wacker	58	(6)
1996–1998	LASK	61	(5)
1999	Greuther Fürth	6	(0)
1999–2002	Schwarz-Weiß Bregenz	75	(3)
2002–2003	Austria Lustenau		
2003–2004	VfB Hohenems		
2004–2006	Viktoria Bregenz		

International career
1994–1995	Austria	7	(0)

Managerial career
- 2004–2006: Viktoria Bregenz
- 2007–2008: FC Lustenau (assistant)
- 2010–2011: FC Lustenau
- 2013–2016: Schwarz-Weiß Bregenz
- * Club domestic league appearances and goals

Johann Kogler (born 12 May 1968) is an Austrian football manager and former player who played as a midfielder or defender. He made seven appearances for the Austria national team from 1994 to 1995.
