= Željko Vuković (footballer, born 1962) =

Croatian-Austrian footballer

Personal information
- Full name: Željko Vuković
- Date of birth: 9 February 1962 (age 64)
- Place of birth: Dvor, PR Croatia, Yugoslavia
- Height: 1.83 m (6 ft 0 in)
- Position: Defender

Youth career
- Jedinstvo Dvor

Senior career*
Years	Team	Apps	(Gls)
1985–1988	Dinamo Zagreb	16	(1)
1988–1990	Dinamo Vinkovci	69	(4)
1990–1991	Osijek	34	(1)
1991–1995	Vorwärts Steyr	136	(11)
1995–1999	Grazer AK	103	(7)
1999–2002	Kärnten	63	(0)
Total		421	(24)

International career
1991	Croatia	1	(0)
2001	Austria	3	(0)
- * Club domestic league appearances and goals

Željko Vuković (born 9 February 1962) is a Croatian–Austrian retired football player.

== Club career ==
Born in Dvor, Croatia, back then still within Yugoslavia, he started playing with local club NK Jedinstvo. His first appearance in the Yugoslav First League occurred in 1985 when he was playing in the Croatian giants Dinamo Zagreb, where he played until 1988. Still in Yugoslav First League, in 1988 he moved to Dinamo Vinkovci where he played between 1988 and 1990, having played a total of 69 top league matches in those two seasons there. In summer of 1990, he moved to the neighbouring rivals NK Osijek where he will play a single but very solid season there that will earn him a call to one of the first Croatia national team matches. In 1991, he was transferred to Austrian club Vorwärts Steyr, where he stayed four seasons and played 136 matches, having scored 11 goals, an impressive achievement for a defender. In 1995, he made a big move to GAK Graz where he became one of the pillars in the defense. His 103 games, having scored seven goals, say it all. In 1999, and already with 37 springs on his shoulders, he moved to another Austrian Football Bundesliga club FC Kärnten where he stayed until 2002.

== International career ==
Željko was part of the Croatia national football team in the earliest stages in 1991, playing in an unofficial friendly match against Slovenia. Having afterwards continued his career in Austrian clubs, he received in 2001 a call to play to the Austria national football team, being one of the oldest players to have made the debut for the selection, with a record 39 years. He ended up playing three matches in total for Austria. His final international was a November 2001 World Cup qualification match away against Turkey.

== Honours ==
- 2002 – Austrian Bundesliga Honour award.
