= Vladimír Janočko =

Slovak footballer

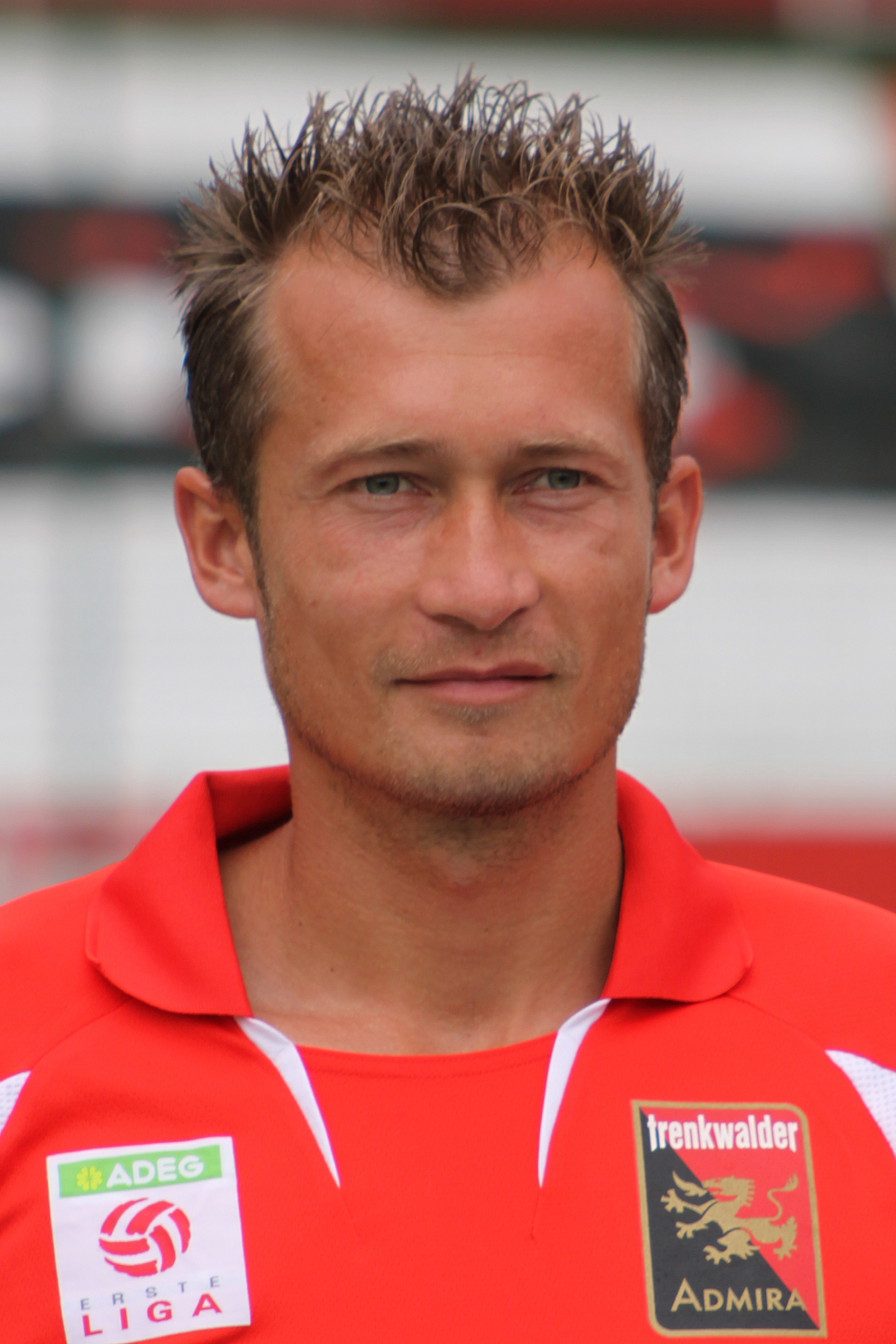
- Janočko with Trenkwalder Admira in 2009

Personal information
- Date of birth: 2 December 1976 (age 49)
- Place of birth: Košice, Czechoslovakia
- Height: 1.76 m (5 ft 9 in)
- Position: Attacking midfielder

Senior career*
Years	Team	Apps	(Gls)
1994–2000	1. FC Košice	105	(15)
2000–2001	Skoda Xanthi	35	(8)
2001–2006	Austria Wien	115	(25)
2006–2009	Red Bull Salzburg	37	(6)
2009–2010	Trenkwalder Admira	22	(4)
2011–2012	FC Leopoldsdorf	8	(5)
2013–2015	Michalovce	45	(6)

International career
1999–2006	Slovakia	41	(3)
- * Club domestic league appearances and goals

Vladimír Janočko (born 2 December 1976) is a Slovak former professional footballer who played as an attacking midfielder. He was capped 41 times for the Slovakia national team and scored three goals.

== Honours ==
1. FC Košice

- Corgoň Liga: 1997, 1998

Austria Wien

- Austrian Bundesliga: 2003, 2006
- Austrian Cup: 2003, 2005, 2006

Salzburg

- Austrian Bundesliga: 2007, 2009

Individual

- Austrian Footballer of the Year: 2002
- Slovak Footballer of the Year: 2003
