= Thomas Höller =

Austrian footballer

Personal information
- Date of birth: 2 June 1976 (age 50)
- Place of birth: Wolfsberg, Austria
- Height: 1.81 m (5 ft 11 1/2 in)
- Position: Midfielder

Senior career*
Years	Team	Apps	(Gls)
?–2004	FC Kärnten	180	(11)
2004–2005	SC Schwarz-Weiß Bregenz	28	(0)
2005–2006	WAC St. Andrä	29	(7)
2007	SV Ruden		
2007–2009	SV Bad Aussee	41	(8)
2009–2012	SVG Bleiburg	48	(12)
2012	SV Ruden	8	(0)
2012–2015	ASKÖ Mittlern		

International career
2002	Austria	2	(0)

Managerial career
- 2009–2012: SVG Bleiburg (player-manager)
- * Club domestic league appearances and goals

Thomas Höller (born 2 June 1976) is a former Austria international footballer.
