= Hundsheim =

- Municipality
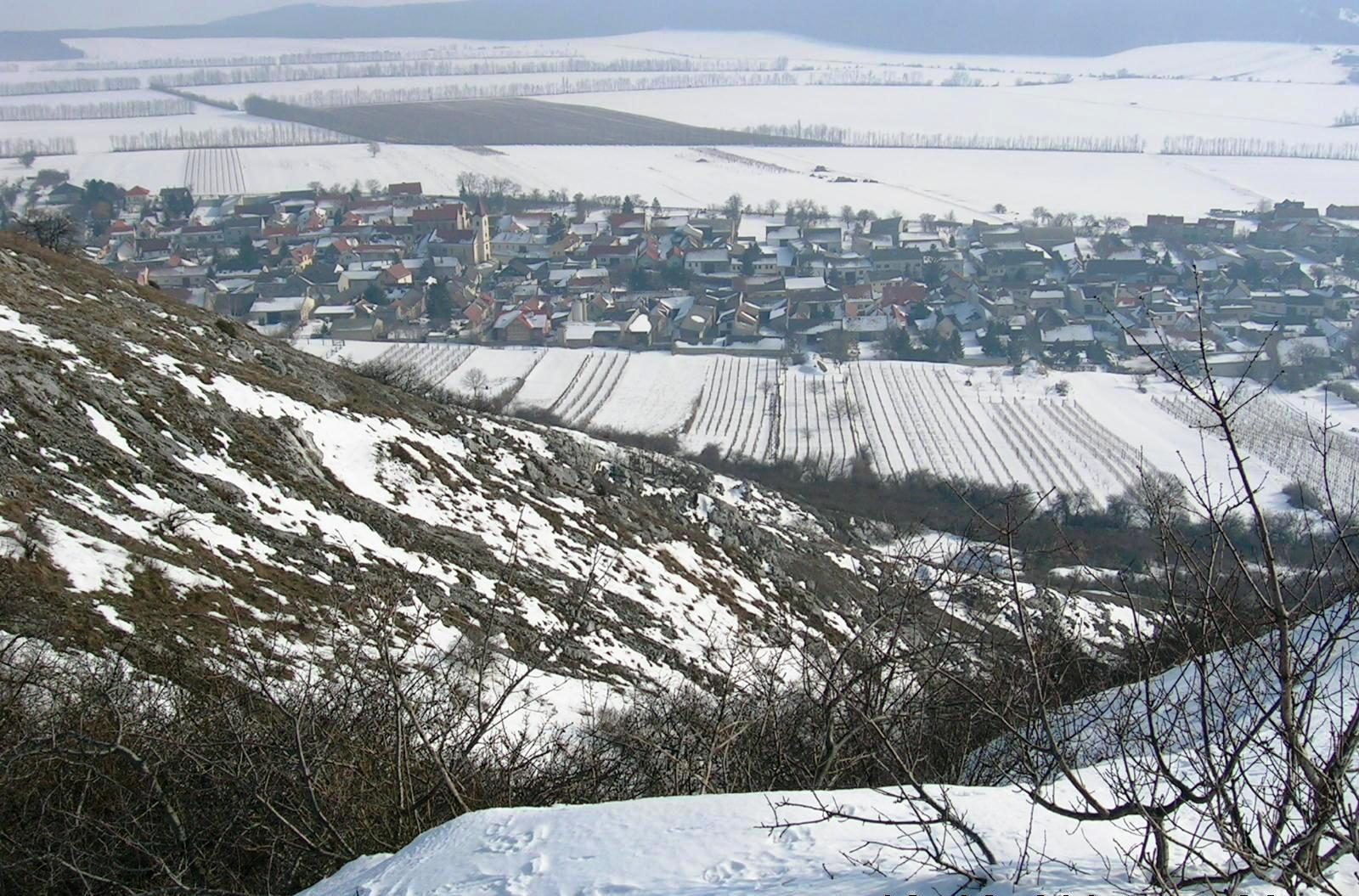
- View of Hundsheim and vineyards in winter

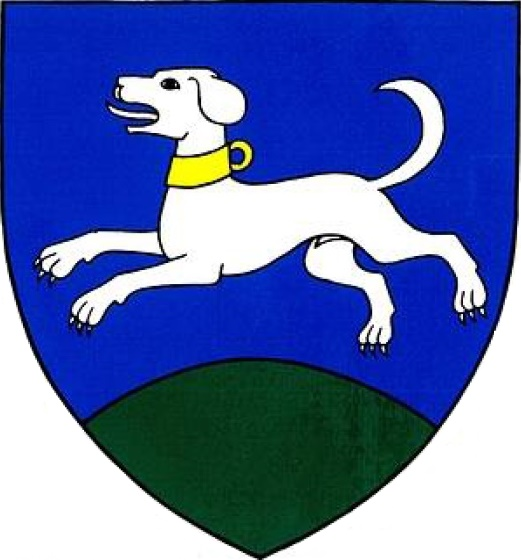
- Coat of arms

- Location within Austria
- Coordinates: 48°7′N 16°51′E
- Country: Austria
- State: Lower Austria
- District: Bruck an der Leitha

Government
  - Mayor: Gerhard Math

Area
  - Total: 13.43 km^{2} (5.19 sq mi)
- Elevation: 233 m (764 ft)

Population (2018-01-01)
  - Total: 590
  - Density: 44/km^{2} (110/sq mi)
- Time zone: UTC+1 (CET)
  - Summer (DST): UTC+2 (CEST)
- Postal code: 2405
- Area code: 02165

Hundsheim is a town in the district of Bruck an der Leitha in Lower Austria, in northeast Austria.

== Geography ==
Hundsheim lies in the industrial area of Lower Austria, but it is largely agrarian. It lies at the foot of the Hundsheimer Mountain (480 m). About 28 percent of the municipality is forested.
