= Jürgen Hartmann (footballer, born 1970) =

Austrian footballer

Personal information
- Date of birth: 28 August 1970 (age 56)
- Place of birth: Leoben, Austria
- Height: 1.80 m (5 ft 11 in)
- Position: Defender

Senior career*
Years	Team	Apps	(Gls)
1989–1990	Donawitzer SV Alpine		
1990–1997	FC Tirol Innsbruck		
1993	→ Grazer AK (loan)		
1997–2003	Grazer AK		

International career
1990–1992	Austria	8	(0)
- * Club domestic league appearances and goals

Jürgen Hartmann (born 28 August 1970) is a retired Austrian football defender.
