= Christoph Freund =

Austrian association football manager

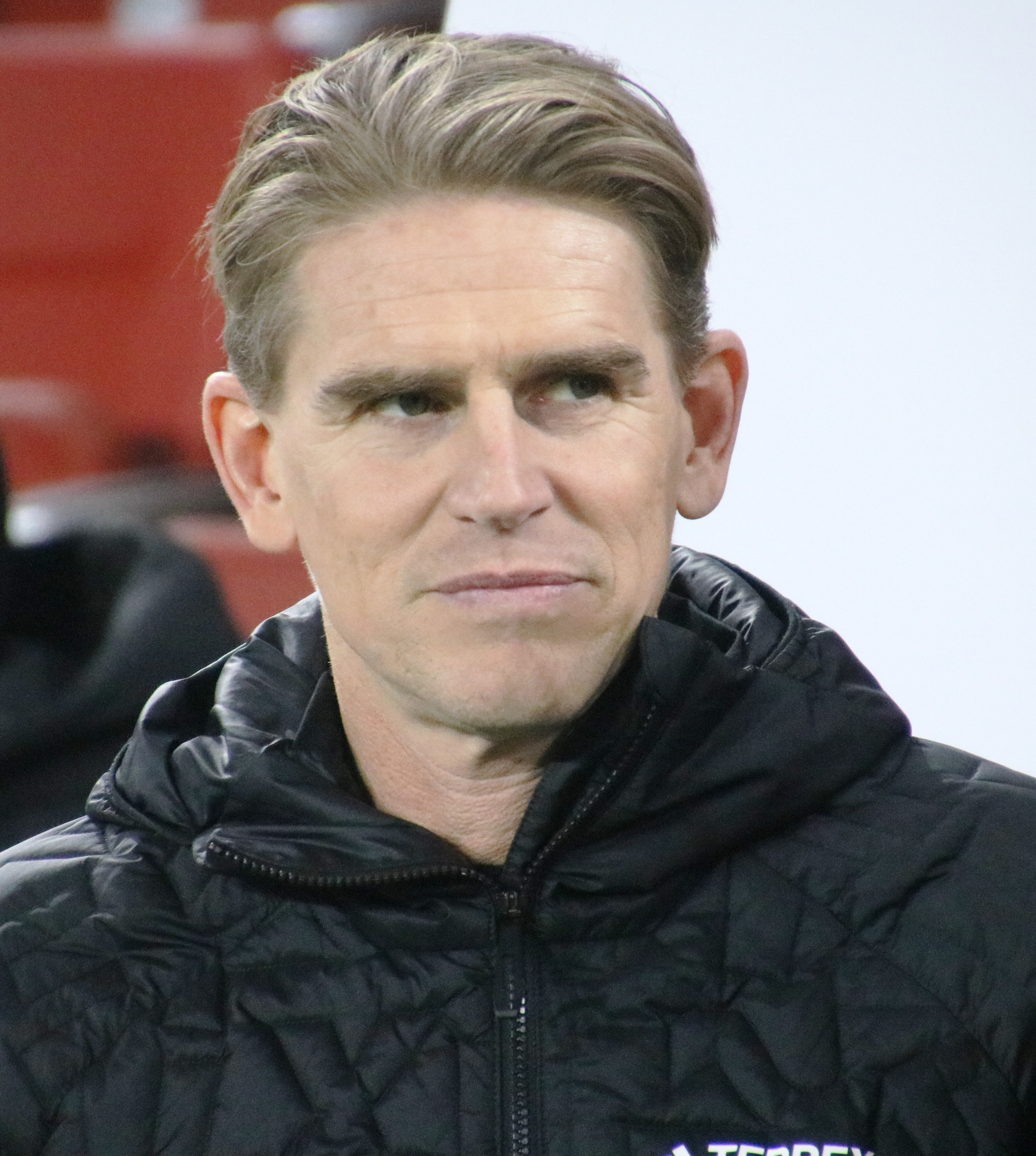
- Freund in 2025

Personal information
- Date of birth: 2 July 1977 (age 49)
- Place of birth: Salzburg, Austria
- Height: 1.80 m (5 ft 11 in)
- Position: Midfielder

Youth career
- 1989–1991: ESV Saalfelden
- 1991–1996: SV Austria Salzburg

Senior career*
Years	Team	Apps	(Gls)
1996–1997	SV Austria Salzburg II		
1997–1999	SC Kundl	55	(0)
1999–2001	WSG Wattens	40	(2)
2001–2002	SC UnterSiebenbrunn	17	(0)
2002–2003	ASVÖ FC Puch	22	(0)
2003–2005	FC Zell am See	28	(0)
2005–2006	SV Grödig	16	(9)
2006–2013	SC Leogang	104	(23)

Managerial career
- 2015–2023: Red Bull Salzburg (sporting director)
- 2023–: Bayern Munich (sporting director)
- * Club domestic league appearances and goals

Christoph Freund (born 2 July 1977) is an Austrian football manager and former footballer who is the sporting director of Bundesliga club Bayern Munich.

== Career ==
Freund spent his entire playing career in the lower divisions of the Austrian leagues. In 2006, he became a team manager at Austrian Bundesliga side Red Bull Salzburg, then he commenced working as a sports coordinator in 2012. In 2015, Freund was appointed as sporting director at the club, succeeding Ralf Rangnick.

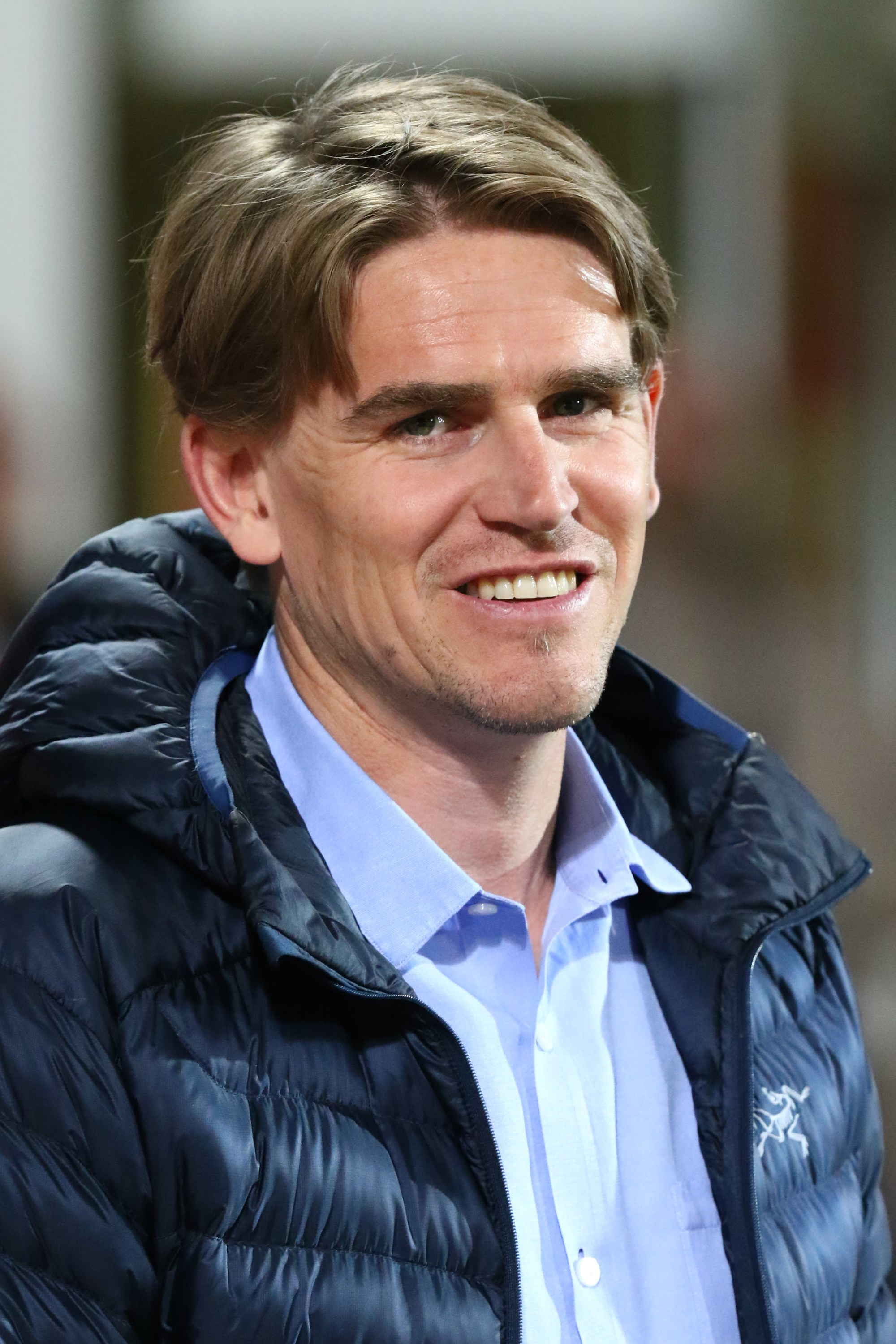
Freund in 2018

In September 2022, Chelsea was on the verge of appointing Freund as the club's new sporting director and the Austrian had already outlined how he likes to work behind the scenes.

In July 2023, Freund was announced to be appointed as sporting director of German Bundesliga side Bayern Munich starting from September.
