= Günter Friesenbichler =

Austrian footballer

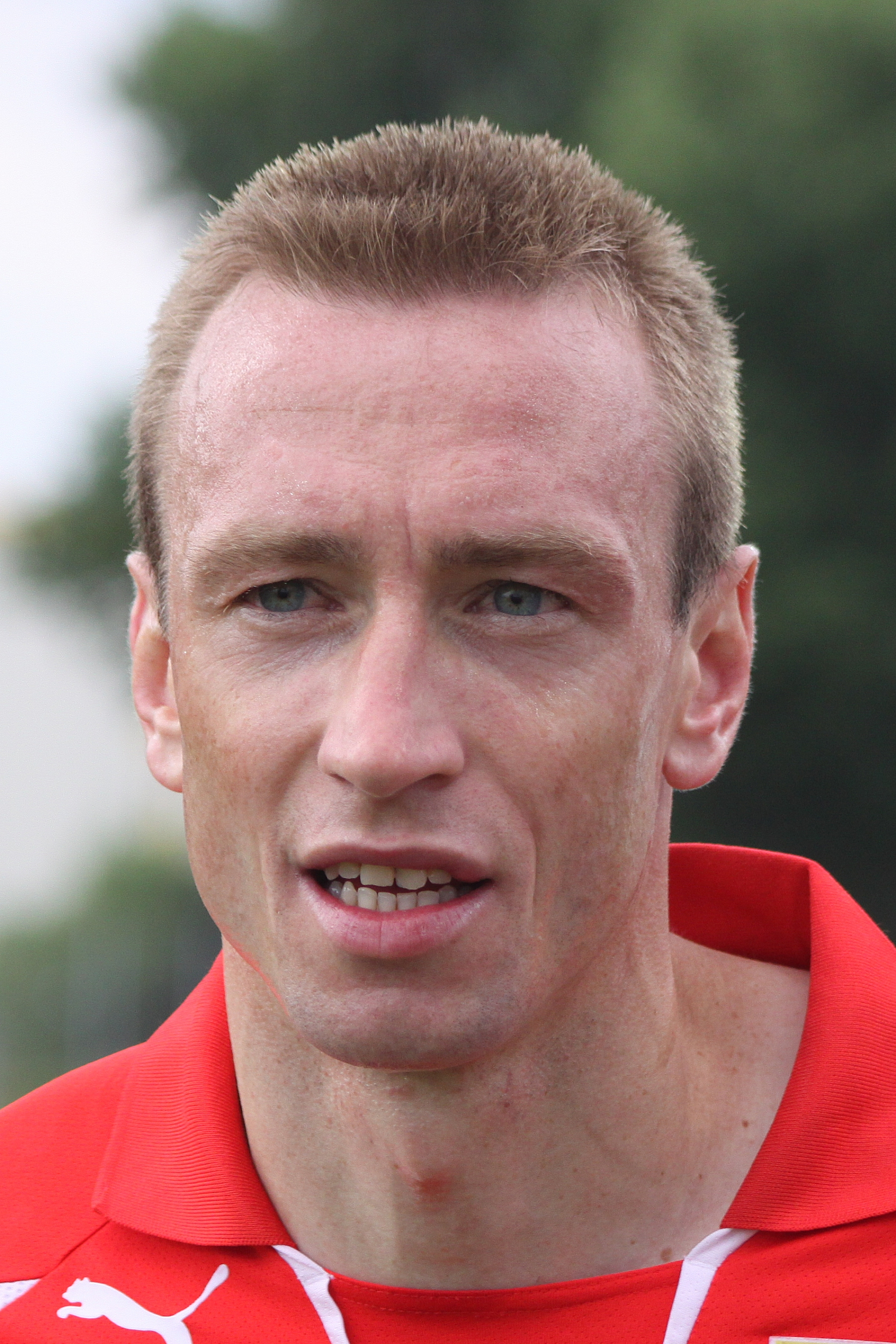

Personal information
- Full name: Günter Friesenbichler
- Date of birth: 4 March 1979 (age 47)
- Place of birth: Weiz, Austria
- Height: 1.93 m (6 ft 4 in)
- Position: Forward

Youth career
- 1986–1997: SC Weiz
- 1997–1998: SV Frohnleiten

Senior career*
| Years | Team | Apps | (Gls) |
| 1998–2000 | SC Bregenz | 18 | (0) |
| 2000–2002 | DSV Leoben | 46 | (14) |
| 2002–2004 | Skoda Xanthi | 40 | (10) |
| 2004–2005 | Egaleo | 6 | (0) |
| 2005 | SV Ried | 9 | (0) |
| 2005–2008 | SC Austria Lustenau | 50 | (26) |
| 2008–2011 | Admira Wacker | 70 | (34) |
| 2011 | TSV Hartberg | 14 | (9) |
| 2011–2013 | SC Wiener Neustadt | 47 | (8) |
| 2013–2015 | TSV Hartberg | 47 | (12) |
- * Club domestic league appearances and goals as of 03 May 2016

Günter Friesenbichler (born 4 March 1979) is a retired Austrian footballer.

He is the brother of retired footballer Bruno Friesenbichler.
