= George Datoru =

Nigerian footballer

Personal information
- Full name: George Martin Datoru
- Date of birth: 25 May 1977 (age 49)
- Place of birth: Port Harcourt, Rivers State, Nigeria
- Height: 1.78 m (5 ft 10 in)
- Position: Striker

Team information
- Current team: Ironi Bat Yam

Senior career*
Years	Team	Apps	(Gls)
1997	Sharks	-	(-)
1997–1998	Admira Wacker Mödling	22	(4)
1998–1999	SK Vorwärts Steyr	31	(3)
1999–2000	FK Austria Wien	43	(5)
2001	Admira Wacker Mödling	12	(1)
2001–2002	FK Austria Wien	23	(4)
2002–2004	SV Pasching	51	(7)
2004	Skoda Xanthi	26	(11)
2004–2006	AEK Larnaca	34	(8)
2006–2007	Hapoel Be'er Sheva	29	(16)
2007–2010	Hapoel Ramat Gan	97	(22)
2010–2011	Ironi Bat Yam	14	(1)
2011	Maccabi Ahi Nazareth	14	(1)

International career
2001	Nigeria	4	(0)
- * Club domestic league appearances and goals

George Datoru (born 25 May 1977 in Port Harcourt) is a former Nigerian football striker.

== Career ==
Having spent many years playing in Austria, he holds an Austrian passport as well. After a season with Sharks, Datoru signed with an Austrian club. In July 2004 he joined to Skoda Xanthi.

== Honours ==
- Cypriot Cup:
  - Runner-up (1): 2006
