= Silva Ribeiro =

Brazilian footballer

Silva Reinaldo Ribeiro
Personal information
- Date of birth: June 8, 1981 (age 45)
- Height: 1.69 m (5 ft 6 1/2 in)
- Position: Midfielder

Team information
- Current team: SC Rheindorf Altach
- Number: 8

Senior career*
Years	Team	Apps	(Gls)
?–2005	Rot-Weiss Rankweil		
2005–2008	SC Austria Lustenau	82	(10)
2008–2009	SC Rheindorf Altach	4	(1)
2010–2012	FC Dornbirn		
2012–	FC Andelsbuch		
- * Club domestic league appearances and goals as of August 15, 2014

Silva Reinaldo Ribeiro (born June 8, 1981) is a Brazilian footballer currently playing for FC Andelsbuch. He also holds Austrian citizenship.
