= Marcel Oerlemans =

Dutch footballer

Personal information
- Full name: Marcel Oerlemans
- Date of birth: 12 January 1969 (age 57)
- Place of birth: Amsterdam, the Netherlands
- Height: 1.80 m (5 ft 11 in)
- Position: Striker

Senior career*
Years	Team	Apps	(Gls)
1993	DWS	0	(0)
1993–1994	Telstar	23	(5)
1994–1995	First Vienna	44	(28)
1995–1996	VfB Mödling	11	(4)
1996–1998	Ried	70	(18)
1998–1999	Haarlem	11	(1)
1999	Fram Reykjavik	14	(5)
1999–2001	Admira Wacker Mödling	35	(8)
2001–2002	Braunau	10	(4)
2002	Hundsheim	5	(2)
2002–2003	Türkiyemspor	7	(1)
2003–2004	SVO Germaringen	9	(3)
2004–2008	Türkiyemspor	111	(46)
2008–2009	Young Boys		
- * Club domestic league appearances and goals

Marcel Oerlemars (born 12 January 1969) is a Dutch retired footballer.

== Career ==
He has played most of the time in the Dutch Eerste Divisie or the Austrian Bundesliga. Except 1999 when he played one summer in the Icelandic premier league for Fram Reykjavik. He was the Austrian second-tier top goalscorer with 20 league goals for First Vienna in the 1994/95 season.
