= Christoph Stückler =

Austrian footballer

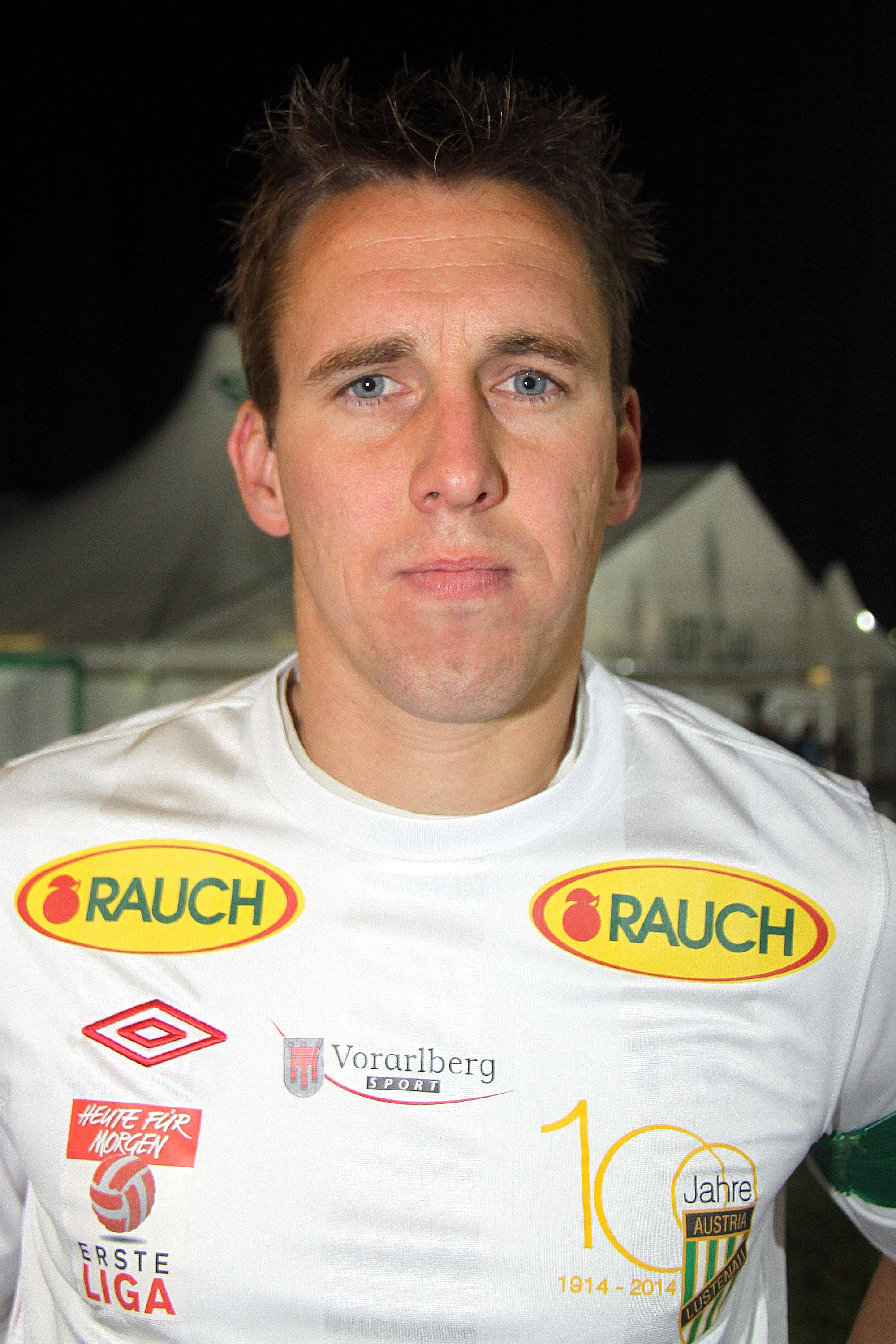
- Stückler in 2013

Personal information
- Date of birth: 27 May 1980 (age 46)
- Place of birth: Austria
- Height: 1.85 m (6 ft 1 in)
- Position: Defender

Team information
- Current team: SC Röthis

Senior career*
Years	Team	Apps	(Gls)
2001–2004	Siedl Software	66	(6)
2004–2006	Kelag Karnten	67	(5)
2006–2008	SC Austria Lustenau	63	(5)
2008–2009	SC Rheindorf Altach	30	(2)
2009–2017	SC Austria Lustenau	266	(21)
2017–2021	SC Röthis		
- * Club domestic league appearances and goals as of 19 May 2017

Christoph Stückler (born 27 May 1980) is a former Austrian defender.
