= Gerhard Breitenberger (footballer, born 1954) =

Austrian footballer

Personal information
- Date of birth: 14 October 1954 (age 72)
- Place of birth: Golling an der Salzach, Austria
- Height: 1.83 m (6 ft 0 in)
- Position: Defender

Senior career*
Years	Team	Apps	(Gls)
1974–1978	VÖEST Linz	91	(2)
1978	K.R.C. Mechelen	7	(1)
1978–1985	Austria Salzburg	155	(3)
Total		253	(6)

International career
1976–1978	Austria	15	(0)
- * Club domestic league appearances and goals

Gerhard Breitenberger (born 14 October 1954, in Austria) is a former international Austrian footballer.

His son, Gerhard Breitenberger Junior, plays for SK Austria Kärnten
