= Gerhard Breitenberger (footballer, born 1979) =

Austrian footballer

Personal information
- Full name: Gerhard Breitenberger
- Date of birth: 7 February 1979 (age 47)
- Place of birth: Schwarzach im Pongau, Austria
- Height: 1.83 m (6 ft 0 in)
- Position: Midfielder

Team information
- Current team: SV Friedburg
- Number: 13

Youth career
- –1996: SK Bischofshofen

Senior career*
Years	Team	Apps	(Gls)
1996–1997	SK Bischofshofen		
1997–1999	SV Austria Salzburg Amateure		
1999–2000	SV Austria Salzburg	1	(0)
2000	SV Braunau	10	(0)
2000–2004	BSV Bad Bleiberg	109	(11)
2004–2005	SC Austria Lustenau	11	(0)
2005–2007	SK Bischofshofen		
2007–2008	1. FC Vöcklabruck	25	(7)
2008–2009	SK Austria Kärnten	3	(0)
2009–2010	SV Grödig	31	(6)
2010–2011	USK Anif	2	(0)
2011–2012	FC Munderfing		
2012–	SV Friedburg		
- * Club domestic league appearances and goals as of 21 October 2015

Gerhard Breitenberger (born 7 February 1979) is an Austrian footballer who currently plays for the SV Friedburg.
