= BSV Bad Bleiberg =

- Full name: Bergmännischer Sportverein Bad Bleiberg
- Founded: 1952; 2006 (re-founded)
- Dissolved: 2004–2006

BSV Bad Bleiberg was an Austrian association football club based in Bad Bleiberg, Carinthia. It was founded in 1952 and became BSV Villach Juniors and moved to Villach in 2003 as a joint-venture with FC Kärnten. The club dissolved in 2004. BSV Bad Bleiberg played in the Austrian Football First League from 2001 until 2003.

In 2006 a new club was founded under the BSV Bad Bleiberg name and plays in the lower amateur ranks.
