= Austrian Supercup =

ÖFB-Supercup
- Founded: 1986
- Abolished: 2004
- Region: Austria
- Teams: 2
- Last champions: Austria Wien (6th title)
- Most championships: Austria Wien (6 titles)

The Austrian Supercup (German: ÖFB-Supercup) was a football competition held annually from 1986 until 2004 between the winners of the Austrian Football Bundesliga and the Austrian Cup.

19 editions were played during the short history of the competition.

== Results of the finals ==
Key
	Team won the Double (Bundesliga and Austrian Cup)
	Austrian Cup Finalist
	Match went to extra time
	Match decided by a penalty shootout after extra time
Italics	Edition an unofficial

Season	Bundesliga Winner	Score	Cup Winner or Finalist
1986	Austria Wien	1–3	**Rapid Wien**
1987	**Rapid Wien**	2–1	Swarovski Tirol
1988	**Rapid Wien**	1–1 (a.e.t.) (3–1 p)	Kremser SC
1989	Swarovski Tirol	1–1 (a.e.t.) (0–3 p)	**Admira Wacker Wien**
1990	Swarovski Tirol	1–5	**Austria Wien**
1991	**Austria Wien**	3–0	SV Stockerau
1992	**Austria Wien**	1–1 (a.e.t.) (5–4 p)	Admira Wacker Wien
1993	**Austria Wien**	1–1 (a.e.t.) (3–1 p)	Tirol Innsbruck †
1994	**SV Austria Salzburg**	2–1	Austria Wien
1995	**SV Austria Salzburg**	2–1	Rapid Wien
1996	Rapid Wien	0–1	**Sturm Graz**
1997	**SV Austria Salzburg**	1–0	Sturm Graz
1998	**Sturm Graz**	4–0	SV Ried
1999	**Sturm Graz**	1–1 (a.e.t.) (5–4 p)	LASK Linz
2000	Tirol Innsbruck	0–2	**Grazer AK**
2001	Tirol Innsbruck	0–0 (a.e.t.) (9–10 p)	**FC Kärnten**
2002	Sturm Graz ‡	0–3	**Grazer AK**
2003	**Austria Wien**	2–1	FC Kärnten
2004	Grazer AK	1–1 (a.e.t.) (2–4 p)	**Austria Wien**
2005	Not Held		
2006	Team Bundesliga	3–3	Team Erste Liga
2007	Not Held		
2008	SK Rapid Wien	7–1	SV Horn

Notes:

- The Winner is typed in **Bold**.
- † The 1992–93 Austrian Cup Winners, Wacker Innsbruck lost its license and they were replaced by the new formed team **Tirol Innsbruck**, which are the continuation of their in the city of Innsbruck.
- ‡ The 2001–02 Bundesliga Champion, Tirol Innsbruck were refused a license for the 2002–03 season and they were replaced by **Sturm Graz**, the 2001–02 Bundesliga Runner-up.

== Performance ==
=== Performance by club ===
Club	Winners	Runners-up	Winning years	Runners-up years
Austria Wien	6	2	1990, 1991, 1992, 1993, 2003, 2004	1986, 1994
Rapid Wien	4	2	1986, 1987, 1988, 2008	1995, 1996
Sturm Graz	3	2	1996, 1998, 1999	1997, 2002
SV Austria Salzburg ‡	3	–	1994, 1995, 1997	–
Grazer AK	2	1	2000, 2002	2004
Admira Wacker Wien *	1	1	1989	1992
FC Kärnten	1	1	2001	2003
Swarovski Tirol (–) (3); Tirol Innsbruck (–) (3) †	–	6	–	1987, 1989, 1990, 1993, 2000, 2001
Kremser SC	–	1	–	1988
SV Stockerau	–	1	–	1991
SV Ried	–	1	–	1998
LASK Linz	–	1	–	1999

Notes:

- † All teams are defunct clubs from Innsbruck, Tirol. Wacker Innsbruck (1915–1999), Swarovski Tirol (1986–1992) and Tirol Innsbruck (1993–2002). They are considered to be the continuation of the each other.
- ‡ The Red Bull company bought the club on 6 April 2005 and rebranded it. Prior 2005 the team was known as SV Austria Salzburg or Casino Salzburg. They also changed the colours from white-violet in red-white. The Violet-Whites ultimately formed a new club, SV Austria Salzburg.
- * FC Admira Wacker Mödling was formed after the merger of SK Admira Wien and SC Wacker Wien in 1971, under the name of Admira Wacker Wien, the merge with VfB Mödling in 1997 and the merge with SK Schwadorf in 2008. The new team play in Mödling.

=== Performance by qualification ===
Competition	Winners	Runners-up
Bundesliga Champion	11	8
Austrian Cup Winner	5	7
Austrian Cup Runner-up	3	4

== See also ==
- Austrian Cup
- Austrian Football Bundesliga
- List of Austrian football champions
