= FC Kärnten =

- Full name: FC Kelag Kärnten
- Founded: 1920; 106 years ago
- Dissolved: 2009; 17 years ago
- Ground: Sportzentrum Fischl, Klagenfurt
- Capacity: 3,000
- League: Austrian Regional League Central
- 2007–08: Red Zac 1st League, 10th
Home colours	Away colours

FC Kärnten was an Austrian association football club based in Klagenfurt, Carinthia. It was founded in 1920 under the name of KSK Klagenfurt.

== History ==
=== Austria Klagenfurt ===
Austria Klagenfurt played successfully in the Kärntner Liga and in 1960 were promoted to the Austrian Regional League Central where they won the 1961–62 championship. Then a member of the Austrian Football Bundesliga (Liga A), they intermittently stayed in first league until their final relegation in 1989. In the 1992–93 season, the club found itself back in the Kärntner Liga.

Though Austria Klagenfurt again gained the promotion to the Regional League Central in 1996, it seemed that the Carinthian Clubs would have to work together in order to send a team to the Bundesliga. This led to cooperation between SK Austria and Villacher SV, who also played in the Regional League, and were based in the nearby town of Villach. In 1997, the clubs changed their name to FC Austria Klagenfurt/VSV and were promoted to the First League.

=== FC Kärnten ===
In 1999, the clubs formally merged under the name FC Kärnten. After the hiring of manager Walter Schachner in 2001, the team won the Austrian Cup, the Supercup and became champions of the First League, resulting in promotion to the Bundesliga the following season. The club, under the honorary presidency of Governor Jörg Haider, once again reached the finals of the Austrian Cup and the Supercup in 2003, which they both lost to FK Austria Wien. FC Kärnten played in the Bundesliga for three years until relegation in 2004.

Their decline continued, exacerbated by the resignation of Jörg Haider in 2006 and the foundation of rival club SK Austria Kärnten in June 2007, who assumed the Bundesliga licence of the defunct ASKÖ Pasching. The team had to cede their stadium, the present-day Hypo-Arena, to Austria Kärnten and retire to the small Fischl ground. At the end of the 2007–08 season, FC Kärnten slipped into the Regional League, prompting several players to leave the club.

In November 2008, the club went into administration, and the club ceased operations on 21 January 2009. The team's tradition is continued by the SK Austria Klagenfurt football club founded in 2007.

== Honours ==
=== Domestic ===
==== League ====
- Austrian Second Division:
  - Winners (2): 1981–82, 2000–01

==== Cups ====
- Austrian Cup:
  - Winners (1): 2000–01
  - Runners-up (1): 2002–03
- Austrian Supercup:
  - Winners (1): 2001
  - Runners-up (1): 2003

== European cup history ==
- Q = Qualification

Season	Competition	Round	Country	Club	Home	Away	Aggregate
2001/02	UEFA Cup	1	(Greece)	PAOK Thessaloniki	0–0	0–4	0–4
2002/03	UEFA Cup	Q1	(Latvia)	FK Liepājas Metalurgs	4–2	2–0	6–2
		1	(Israel)	Hapoel Tel Aviv	0–4	1–0	1–4
2003/04	UEFA Cup	Q1	(Iceland)	Grindavík	2–1	1–1	3–2
		1	(Netherlands)	Feyenoord	0–1	1–2	1–3

== Managers ==
- August Starek (1998–99)
- Walter Schachner (2000–02)
- Rüdiger Abramczik (2002–03)
- Dietmar Constantini (2003)
- Peter Pacult (2004–05)
- Nenad Bjelica (2007–09)
