= 1997–98 UEFA Cup =

27th season of Europe's secondary club football tournament organised by UEFA

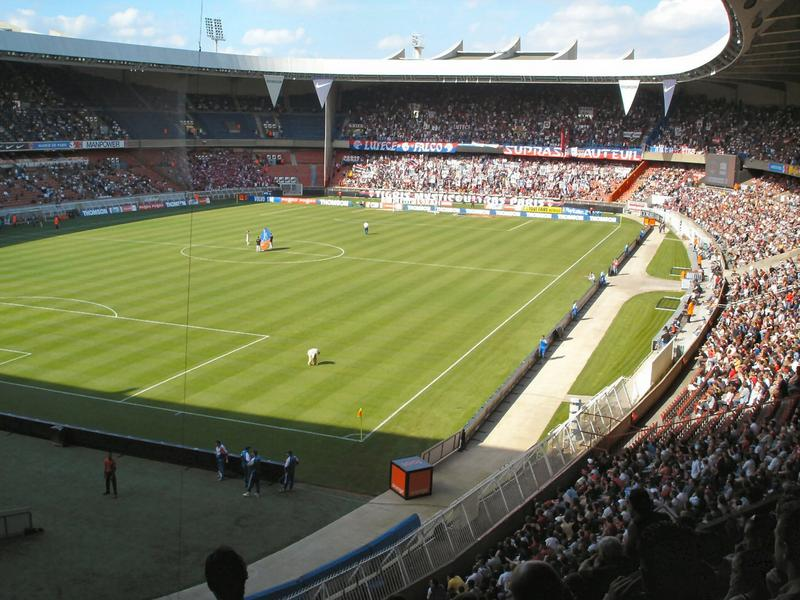
- The final was played at Parc des Princes in Paris
- Dates: 22 July 1997 – 6 May 1998

Final positions
- Champions: (Italy) Inter Milan (3rd title)
- Runners-up: (Italy) Lazio

Tournament statistics
- Matches played: 125
- Goals scored: 332 (2.66 per match)
- Attendance: 2,652,131 (21,217 per match)
- Top scorer(s): Shota Arveladze (Ajax) & Stéphane Guivarc'h (Auxerre); 7 goals

The 1997–98 UEFA Cup was the 27th season of the UEFA Cup, the third-tier of club football in Europe organised by UEFA. It was won by Inter Milan of Italy, who beat fellow Italian club SS Lazio 3-0 in the final at the Parc des Princes. It was their third title in eight years in the competition.

It was the first instance of the UEFA Cup final being a one-game contest at a neutral stadium, having previously being decided over two legs with each team having one home game. This was the first tournament where the 2nd placed team of major European leagues went to the Champions League instead of the UEFA Cup.

For first time, one nation (France) was represented by seven teams: Strasbourg, Auxerre, Bastia, Nantes, Lyon, Bordeaux and Metz.

== Format ==
According to 1996 UEFA ranking, Spain took a slot to Germany (but this one took the place of the holders), the Netherlands took a place from Russia, while Ukraine, Czech Republic, and Hungary took a slot from Israel, FR Yugoslavia and Poland (but this one took the place of troubled Albania).

The access list was finally decreased to 102 clubs, because only the 16 best national champions excluded from the Champions League group stage entered in the UEFA Cup.

== Teams ==
The labels in the parentheses show how each team qualified for the place of its starting round:

- TH: Title holders
- LC: League Cup winners
- Nth: League position
- IC: Intertoto Cup winners
- FP: Fair play
- CL Q2: Losers from the Champions League second qualifying round

First round
(Germany) Schalke 04 (TH)	(France) Strasbourg (LC)	(England) Leicester City (LC)	(Israel) Beitar Jerusalem (CL Q2)
(Italy) Internazionale (3rd)	(Germany) Bochum (5th)	(Turkey) Fenerbahçe (3rd)	(Hungary) MTK (CL Q2)
(Italy) Lazio (4th)	(Germany) Karlsruhe (6th)	(Austria) Wüstenrot Salzburg (CL Q2)	(Georgia (country)) Dinamo Tbilisi (CL Q2)
(Italy) Udinese (5th)	(Germany) 1860 Munich (7th)	(Russia) Spartak Moscow (CL Q2)	(Latvia) Skonto (CL Q2)
(Italy) Sampdoria (6th)	(Netherlands) Twente (3rd)	(Denmark) Brøndby (CL Q2)	(Slovenia) Maribor (CL Q2)
(Spain) Deportivo La Coruña (3rd)	(Netherlands) Ajax (4th)	(Switzerland) Sion (CL Q2)	(Finland) Jazz (CL Q2)
(Spain) Atlético Madrid (5th)	(Netherlands) Vitesse (5th)	(Poland) Widzew Łódź (CL Q2)	(Belarus) MPKC Mozyr (CL Q2)
(Spain) Athletic Bilbao (6th)	(Portugal) Benfica (3rd)	(Scotland) Rangers (CL Q2)	(France) Auxerre (IC)
(Spain) Real Valladolid (7th)	(Portugal) Braga (4th)	(Romania) Steaua București (CL Q2)	(France) Bastia (IC)
(France) Nantes (3rd)	(Portugal) Vitória Guimarães (5th)	Croatia Zagreb (CL Q2)	(France) Lyon (IC)
(France) Bordeaux (4th)	(England) Arsenal (3rd)	(Cyprus) Anorthosis Famagusta (CL Q2)	(England) Aston Villa (FP)
(France) Metz (5th)	(England) Liverpool (4th)		
Second qualifying round
(Turkey) Trabzonspor (4th)	(Greece) OFI (3rd)	(Russia) Alania Vladikavkaz (2nd)	(Sweden) Malmö FF (2nd)
(Belgium) Club Brugge (2nd)	(Greece) PAOK (4th)	(Russia) Rotor Volgograd (3rd)	(Sweden) Helsingborg (3rd)
(Belgium) Mouscron (3rd)	(Austria) Rapid Wien (2nd)	(Denmark) Vejle (2nd)	(Norway) Lillestrøm (2nd)
(Belgium) Anderlecht (4th)	(Austria) Tirol Innsbruck (4th)	(Denmark) AGF (3rd)	(Sweden) Örebro (FP)
First qualifying round
(Norway) Viking (3rd)	(Ukraine) Dnipro Dnipropetrovsk (4th)	(Slovenia) Gorica (3rd)	(Federal Republic of Yugoslavia) Vojvodina (3rd)
(Czech Republic) Jablonec (3rd)	(Hungary) Újpest (2nd)	(Finland) MyPa (2nd)	(Estonia) Flora (2nd)
(Czech Republic) Boby Brno (4th)	(Hungary) Ferencváros (3rd)	(Belarus) Dinamo Minsk (2nd)	(Malta) Birkirkara (2nd)
(Switzerland) Neuchâtel Xamax (2nd)	(Poland) Odra Wodzisław (3rd)	(Iceland) KR (2nd)	(Republic of Ireland) Bohemians (2nd)
(Switzerland) Grasshopper (3rd)	(Croatia) Hajduk Split (2nd)	(Bulgaria) Neftochimic Burgas (2nd)	(Armenia) Yerevan (3rd)
(Scotland) Celtic (2nd)	(Cyprus) Apollon Limassol (2nd)	(North Macedonia) Pobeda (2nd)	(Luxembourg) Grevenmacher (2nd)
(Scotland) Dundee United (3rd)	(Israel) Hapoel Petah Tikva (2nd)	(Lithuania) Inkaras Kaunas (3rd)	(Faroe Islands) KÍ (2nd)
(Romania) Dinamo București (3rd)	(Georgia (country)) Kolkheti Poti (2nd)	(Moldova) Tiligul Tiraspol (3rd)	(Azerbaijan) Qarabağ (2nd)
(Romania) Oțelul Galați (4th)	(Slovakia) Spartak Trnava (2nd)	(Northern Ireland) Coleraine (2nd)	(Andorra) Principat (1st)
(Ukraine) Vorskla Poltava (3rd)	(Latvia) Daugava Rīga (2nd)	(Wales) Inter CableTel (2nd)	(Norway) Brann (FP)

Notes

1. Albania (ALB): Clubs from Albania were not admitted to UEFA competitions as 1996–97 Albanian Superliga was suspended for several months due to the 1997 Albanian civil unrest and eventually ended in mid-August 1997, past the UEFA deadline.

== First qualifying round ==
Team 1	Agg.	Team 2	1st leg	2nd leg
Dinamo Minsk (Belarus)	2–2 (a)	(Georgia (country)) Kolkheti Poti	1–0	1–2
Hapoel Petah Tikva (Israel)	3–1	(Estonia) Flora	1–0	2–1
Dnipro Dnipropetrovsk (Ukraine)	8–1	(Armenia) Yerevan	6–1	2–0
Inkaras Kaunas (Lithuania)	4–7	(Czech Republic) Boby Brno	3–1	1–6
MyPa (Finland)	1–4	(Cyprus) Apollon Limassol	1–1	0–3
Inter CableTel (Wales)	0–8	(Scotland) Celtic	0–3	0–5
Neuchâtel Xamax (Switzerland)	10–1	(Moldova) Tiligul Tiraspol	7–0	3–1
Grevenmacher (Luxembourg)	1–6	(Croatia) Hajduk Split	1–4	0–2
Grasshopper (Switzerland)	10–1	(Northern Ireland) Coleraine	3–0	7–1
Vojvodina (Federal Republic of Yugoslavia)	2–2 (4–5 p)	(Norway) Viking	0–2	2–0 (aet)
KR (Iceland)	4–1	(Romania) Dinamo București	2–0	2–1
Bohemians (Republic of Ireland)	0–6	(Hungary) Ferencváros	0–1	0–5
Jablonec (Czech Republic)	8–0	(Azerbaijan) Qarabağ	5–0	3–0
Birkirkara (Malta)	1–4	(Slovakia) Spartak Trnava	0–1	1–3
Odra Wodzisław (Poland)	4–2	(North Macedonia) Pobeda	3–0	1–2
Daugava Rīga (Latvia)	2–5	(Ukraine) Vorskla Poltava	1–3	1–2
Brann (Norway)	4–4 (a)	(Bulgaria) Neftochimic Burgas	2–1	2–3
Principat (Andorra)	0–17	(Scotland) Dundee United	0–8	0–9
Gorica (Slovenia)	4–4 (a)	(Romania) Oţelul Galaţi	2–0	2–4
Újpest (Hungary)	9–2	(Faroe Islands) KÍ	6–0	3–2

=== First leg ===
22 July 1997
19:30

Birkirkara (Malta)	0–1	(Slovakia) Spartak Trnava
	Report	Tittel 14'

National Stadium, Ta' Qali
Attendance: 1,715
Referee: Lucílio Batista (Portugal)

23 July 1997
17:00

Dinamo Minsk (Belarus)	1–0	(Georgia (country)) Kolkheti Poti
Charnyawski 12'	Report

City Stadium, Maladzyechna
Attendance: 1,342
Referee: Tomasz Mikulski (Poland)

23 July 1997
14:00

Hapoel Petah Tikva (Israel)	1–0	(Estonia) Flora
Márton 88'	Report

Municipal Stadium, Rishon LeZion
Attendance: 750
Referee: Jan Wegereef (Netherlands)

23 July 1997
17:00

Dnipro Dnipropetrovsk (Ukraine)	6–1	(Armenia) Yerevan
Hetsko 31'; Sharan 55', 62', 74'; Palyanytsya 60'; Moroz 72'	Report	K. Dokhoyan 81'

Meteor Stadium, Dnipropetrovsk
Attendance: 5,500
Referee: Roy Helge Olsen (Norway)

23 July 1997
18:00

Inkaras Kaunas (Lithuania)	3–1	(Czech Republic) Boby Brno
Přibyl 14' (o.g.); Šlekys 66' (pen.); Rudžionis 74'	Report	Pav. Holomek 5'

Darius and Girėnas Stadium, Kaunas
Attendance: 2,000
Referee: Slavik Kazaryan (Armenia)

23 July 1997
18:00

MyPa (Finland)	1–1	(Cyprus) Apollon Limassol
Enberg 35'	Report	Tsolakis 86'

Saviniemen jalkapallostadion, Kouvola
Attendance: 2,180
Referee: Otar Guntadze (Georgia)

23 July 1997
20:30

Inter CableTel (Wales)	0–3	(Scotland) Celtic
	Report	Thom 5' (pen.); Johnson 44'; Wieghorst 80'

Ninian Park, Cardiff
Attendance: 6,980
Referee: Arturo Daudén Ibáñez (Spain)

23 July 1997
20:00

Neuchâtel Xamax (Switzerland)	7–0	(Moldova) Tiligul Tiraspol
Isabella 8', 17'; Kunz 15'; Sandjak 69'; Perret 71'; Rothenbühler 75'; Gigon 90'	Report

Stade de la Maladière, Neuchâtel
Attendance: 3,700
Referee: Ivan Dobrinov (Bulgaria)

23 July 1997
20:00

Grevenmacher (Luxembourg)	1–4	(Croatia) Hajduk Split
Thill 69'	Report	Erceg 9'; Tudor 23'; Vulić 32', 88'

Stade Josy Barthel, Luxembourg
Attendance: 1,200
Referee: Takhir Souleimanov (Azerbaijan)

23 July 1997
19:30

Grasshopper (Switzerland)	3–0	(Northern Ireland) Coleraine
Yakin 33'; Moldovan 35'; Subiat 79'	Report

Hardturm, Zurich
Attendance: 5,100
Referee: Livio Bazzoli (Italy)

23 July 1997
17:30

Vojvodina (Federal Republic of Yugoslavia)	0–2	(Norway) Viking
	Report	Skogheim 52'; Andresen 70'

Gradski Stadion, Novi Sad
Attendance: 3,500
Referee: Sergei Khusainov (Russia)

23 July 1997
22:00

KR (Iceland)	2–0	(Romania) Dinamo București
Daníelsson 27' (pen.); Daðason 51'	Report

KR-völlur, Reykjavík
Attendance: 1,035
Referee: Patrick Dempsey (Republic of Ireland)

23 July 1997
20:45

Bohemians (Republic of Ireland)	0–1	(Hungary) Ferencváros
	Report	Zavadszky 29'

Dalymount Park, Dublin
Attendance: 2,988
Referee: Sven Kjelbrott (Norway)

23 July 1997
16:30

Jablonec (Czech Republic)	5–0	(Azerbaijan) Qarabağ
Holub 7', 77'; Neumann 11', 37'; Hromádko 26'	Report

Stadion Střelnice, Jablonec nad Nisou
Attendance: 2,830
Referee: Robert Sedlacek (Austria)

23 July 1997
17:00

Odra Wodzisław (Poland)	3–0	(North Macedonia) Pobeda
Polak 33'; Paluch 47'; Nosal 68'	Report

Stadion MOSiR, Wodzisław Śląski
Attendance: 2,700
Referee: Carlo Bertolini (Switzerland)

23 July 1997
18:00

Daugava Rīga (Latvia)	1–3	(Ukraine) Vorskla Poltava
Vucāns 71'	Report	Kobzar 50'; Chuichenko 65'; Antyukhin 69'

Daugava Stadium, Riga
Attendance: 1,800
Referee: Lassin Isaksen (Faroe Islands)

23 July 1997
19:30

Brann (Norway)	2–1	(Bulgaria) Neftochimic Burgas
Mjelde 22'; Løvvik 28'	Report	Kishishev 81'

Brann Stadion, Bergen
Attendance: 6,415
Referee: Claus Bo Larsen (Denmark)

23 July 1997
20:00

Principat (Andorra)	0–8	(Scotland) Dundee United
	Report	Winters 13', 31', 75', 77'; McSwegan 46', 73', 76'; Zetterlund 49'

Estadi Comunal d'Andorra la Vella, Andorra la Vella
Attendance: 664
Referee: Pierluigi Collina (Italy)

23 July 1997
17:00

Gorica (Slovenia)	2–0	(Romania) Oțelul Galați
Demirović 32'; Bečaj 90'	Report

Športni park Nova Gorica, Nova Gorica
Attendance: 1,221
Referee: John Rowbotham (Scotland)

23 July 1997
17:00

Újpest (Hungary)	6–0	(Faroe Islands) KÍ
Z. Kovács 6', 11', 86'; Herczeg 8', 26'; Jenei 37'	Report

Megyeri úti Stadion, Budapest
Attendance: 2,932
Referee: Marco Tura (San Marino)

=== Second leg ===
29 July 1997
20:45

Celtic (Scotland)	5–0	(Wales) Inter CableTel
Thom 19' (pen.); Jackson 43'; Johnson 44'; Hannah 63'; Hay 86'	Report

Celtic Park, Glasgow
Attendance: 41,537
Referee: Alfred Micallef (Malta)

Celtic won 8–0 on aggregate.

29 July 1997
20:00

Hajduk Split (Croatia)	2–0	(Luxembourg) Grevenmacher
Bulat 60'; Erceg 89'	Report

Stadion Poljud, Split
Attendance: 9,500
Referee: Spyros Papadakos (Greece)

Hajduk Split won 6–1 on aggregate.

29 July 1997
19:00

Ferencváros (Hungary)	5–0	(Republic of Ireland) Bohemians
Albert 14'; Jagodics 48', 74'; Schultz 57'; Zavadszky 70'	Report

Üllői úti Stadion, Budapest
Attendance: 7,170
Referee: Marnix Sandra (Belgium)

Ferencváros won 6–0 on aggregate.

30 July 1997
18:30

Kolkheti Poti (Georgia (country))	2–1	(Belarus) Dinamo Minsk
Mikaberidze 37'; Gaganidze 48'	Report	U. Makowski 16'

Fazisi Stadium, Poti
Attendance: 3,200
Referee: Andrey Butenko (Russia)

2–2 on aggregate. Dinamo Minsk won on away goals.

30 July 1997
18:00

Flora (Estonia)	1–2	(Israel) Hapoel Petah Tikva
Oper 16'	Report	Ofri 46'; Kakoun 62'

Kadriorg Stadium, Tallinn
Attendance: 900
Referee: Zoran Arsić (FR Yugoslavia)

Hapoel Petah Tikva won 3–1 on aggregate.

30 July 1997
15:00

Yerevan (Armenia)	0–2	(Ukraine) Dnipro Dnipropetrovsk
	Report	Hetsko 41'; Belkin 90'

Hrazdan Stadium, Yerevan
Attendance: 500
Referee: Martin Ingvarsson (Sweden)

Dnipro Dnipropetrovsk won 8–1 on aggregate.

30 July 1997
17:00

Boby Brno (Czech Republic)	6–1	(Lithuania) Inkaras Kaunas
Chaloupka 7', 50'; Valnoha 15', 53'; Pav. Holomek 25'; Kolomazník 63'	Report	Rudžionis 16'

Stadion Za Lužánkami, Brno
Attendance: 16,800
Referee: Knud Erik Fisker (Denmark)

Boby Brno won 7–4 on aggregate.

30 July 1997
18:00

Apollon Limassol (Cyprus)	3–0	(Finland) MyPa
Mladenović 50'; Tsolakis 54'; Pittas 82'	Report

Tsirio Stadium, Limassol
Attendance: 6,000
Referee: Hermann Albrecht (Germany)

Apollon Limassol won 4–1 on aggregate.

30 July 1997
17:00

Tiligul Tiraspol (Moldova)	1–3	(Switzerland) Neuchâtel Xamax
Lukianchikov 14'	Report	Sandjak 11'; Martin 28'; Jeanneret 81'

Stadionul Municipal, Tiraspol
Attendance: 2,500
Referee: Sándor Piller (Hungary)

Neuchâtel Xamax won 10–1 on aggregate.

30 July 1997
20:30

Coleraine (Northern Ireland)	1–7	(Switzerland) Grasshopper
O'Dowd 23'	Report	Magnin 15'; Esposito 28'; Ahinful 39'; Shiels 51' (o.g.); Tikva 62'; Yakin 63'; Aspinall 81' (o.g.)

The Showgrounds, Coleraine
Attendance: 1,475
Referee: Algirdas Dubinskas (Lithuania)

Grasshopper won 10–1 on aggregate.

30 July 1997
18:00

Viking (Norway)	0–2 (a.e.t.)	(Federal Republic of Yugoslavia) Vojvodina
	Report	Vulević 4', 88'
Penalties
Nyhaug (penalty scored); Aarsheim (penalty scored); Flindt-Bjerg (penalty scored); Fuglestad (penalty scored); Espevoll (penalty scored)	5–4	(penalty scored) Miloševski; (penalty missed) Aleksić; (penalty scored) Vulević; (penalty scored) Jovanović; (penalty scored) Vanić

Stavanger Stadion, Stavanger
Attendance: 2,377
Referee: Dick Jol (Netherlands)

2–2 on aggregate. Viking won 5–4 on penalties.

30 July 1997
16:00

Dinamo București (Romania)	1–2	(Iceland) KR
Mihalcea 41'	Report	Daðason 13', 32'

Stadionul Dinamo, Bucharest
Attendance: 6,500
Referee: Claude Colombo (France)

KR won 4–1 on aggregate.

30 July 1997
16:00

Qarabağ (Azerbaijan)	0–3	(Czech Republic) Jablonec
	Report	Procházka 74'; Holub 85'; Fukal 86'

Tofiq Bahramov Republican Stadium, Baku
Attendance: 5,000
Referee: Sorin Corpodean (Romania)

Jablonec won 8–0 on aggregate.

30 July 1997
19:00

Spartak Trnava (Slovakia)	3–1	(Malta) Birkirkara
Timko 29'; Hadviger 45'; Formanko 88'	Report	M. Galea 85'

Štadión Spartaka, Trnava
Attendance: 11,095
Referee: Tudor Cepoi (Moldova)

Spartak Trnava won 4–1 on aggregate.

30 July 1997
17:00

Pobeda (North Macedonia)	2–1	(Poland) Odra Wodzisław
Rogério 78', 87'	Report	Zagórski 18'

Stadion Goce Delčev, Prilep
Attendance: 5,000
Referee: Miroslav Liba (Czech Republic)

Odra Wodzisław won 4–2 on aggregate.

30 July 1997
17:00

Vorskla Poltava (Ukraine)	2–1	(Latvia) Daugava Rīga
Chuichenko 30'; Antyukhin 57'	Report	Vucāns 50'

Vorskla Stadium, Poltava
Attendance: 8,260
Referee: Dani Koren (Israel)

Vorskla Poltava won 5–2 on aggregate.

30 July 1997
19:00

Neftochimic Burgas (Bulgaria)	3–2	(Norway) Brann
Parushev 10'; Trendafilov 28'; Kiselichkov 72'	Report	Hasund 68', 84'

Neftochimic Stadium, Burgas
Attendance: 17,000
Referee: Bernard Saules (France)

4–4 on aggregate. Brann won on away goals.

30 July 1997
20:30

Dundee United (Scotland)	9–0	(Andorra) Principat
McSwegan 8', 24', 65'; Winters 23', 42'; McLaren 37'; Olofsson 55'; Zetterlund 59'; Thompson 88'	Report

Tannadice Park, Dundee
Attendance: 6,695
Referee: Andreas Georgiou (Cyprus)

Dundee United won 17–0 on aggregate.

30 July 1997
16:00

Oţelul Galaţi (Romania)	4–2	(Slovenia) Gorica
Ștefan 19', 23' (pen.); State 66'; V. Ion 75'	Report	Protega 86'; Demirović 90'

Stadionul Oțelul, Galați
Attendance: 4,000
Referee: Juan Brito Arceo (Spain)

4–4 on aggregate. Gorica won on away goals.

30 July 1997
19:15

KÍ (Faroe Islands)	2–3	(Hungary) Újpest
Danielsen 14'; Mørkøre 73'	Report	Szanyó 39'; Sebők 77', 89'

Svangaskarð, Toftir
Attendance: 205
Referee: Peter Jones (England)

Újpest won 9–2 on aggregate.

== Second qualifying round ==
Team 1	Agg.	Team 2	1st leg	2nd leg
Hajduk Split (Croatia)	5–2	(Sweden) Malmö FF	3–2	2–0
Anderlecht (Belgium)	4–0	(Ukraine) Vorskla Poltava	2–0	2–0
Neuchâtel Xamax (Switzerland)	4–2	(Norway) Viking	3–0	1–2
Rotor Volgograd (Russia)	6–3	(Poland) Odra Wodzisław	2–0	4–3
Trabzonspor (Turkey)	2–1	(Scotland) Dundee United	1–0	1–1
Rapid Wien (Austria)	6–3	(Czech Republic) Boby Brno	6–1	0–2
Tirol Innsbruck (Austria)	5–7	(Scotland) Celtic	2–1	3–6
Helsingborg (Sweden)	1–1 (3–4p)	(Hungary) Ferencváros	0–1	1–0 (aet)
Vejle (Denmark)	0–1	(Israel) Hapoel Petah Tikva	0–0	0–1
Grasshopper (Switzerland)	3–2	(Norway) Brann	3–0	0–2
Gorica (Slovenia)	3–8	(Belgium) Club Brugge	3–5	0–3
PAOK (Greece)	6–3	(Slovakia) Spartak Trnava	5–3	1–0
KR (Iceland)	1–3	(Greece) OFI	0–0	1–3
Jablonec (Czech Republic)	1–1 (a)	(Sweden) Örebro	1–1	0–0
Apollon Limassol (Cyprus)	0–3	(Belgium) Mouscron	0–0	0–3
Dinamo Minsk (Belarus)	0–3	(Norway) Lillestrøm	0–2	0–1
Újpest (Hungary)	2–3	(Denmark) AGF	0–0	2–3
Alania Vladikavkaz (Russia)	6–2	(Ukraine) Dnipro Dnipropetrovsk	2–1	4–1

=== First leg ===
12 August 1997
20:00

Hajduk Split (Croatia)	3–2	(Sweden) Malmö FF
Skoko 77'; Sedloski 79'; Sarr 89'	Report	Wirmola 11'; Gudmundsson 59'

Stadion Poljud, Split
Attendance: 20,000
Referee: Celino Gracia Redondo (Spain)

12 August 1997
20:00

Anderlecht (Belgium)	2–0	(Ukraine) Vorskla Poltava
Petersen 18'; Stoica 89'	Report

Stade Constant Vanden Stock, Brussels
Attendance: 18,167
Referee: Juan Brito Arceo (Spain)

12 August 1997
20:00

Neuchâtel Xamax (Switzerland)	3–0	(Norway) Viking
Sandjak 53', 80'; Fuglestad 58' (o.g.)	Report

Stade de la Maladière, Neuchâtel
Attendance: 6,100
Referee: Jacek Granat (Poland)

12 August 1997
17:00

Rotor Volgograd (Russia)	2–0	(Poland) Odra Wodzisław
Niederhaus 75'; Veretennikov 89'	Report

Central Stadium, Volgograd
Attendance: 20,000
Referee: Bernard Saules (France)

12 August 1997
19:00

Trabzonspor (Turkey)	1–0	(Scotland) Dundee United
Hami 78' (pen.)	Report

Hüseyin Avni Aker Stadium, Trabzon
Attendance: 7,300
Referee: Hellmut Krug (Germany)

12 August 1997
19:15

Rapid Wien (Austria)	6–1	(Czech Republic) Boby Brno
Ipoua 36', 62'; Stöger 45', 86'; Prosenik 78'; Stumpf 80'	Report	Dostálek 53'

Gerhard-Hanappi-Stadion, Vienna
Attendance: 14,000
Referee: Sándor Piller (Hungary)

12 August 1997
21:00

Tirol Innsbruck (Austria)	2–1	(Scotland) Celtic
Mayrleb 22', 28'	Report	Stubbs 82'

Tivoli-Stadion, Innsbruck
Attendance: 5,082
Referee: Roelof Lunge (Netherlands)

12 August 1997
19:00

Helsingborg (Sweden)	0–1	(Hungary) Ferencváros
	Report	Vincze 41'

Olympia, Helsingborg
Attendance: 6,523
Referee: Graham Poll (England)

12 August 1997
20:00

Vejle (Denmark)	0–0	(Israel) Hapoel Petah Tikva
	Report

Vejle Stadion, Vejle
Attendance: 3,070
Referee: Lawrence Sammut (Malta)

12 August 1997
19:30

Grasshopper (Switzerland)	3–0	(Norway) Brann
Magnin 50'; Türkyilmaz 65'; Thüler 83'	Report

Hardturm, Zurich
Attendance: 5,650
Referee: Sergei Khusainov (Russia)

12 August 1997
17:30

Gorica (Slovenia)	3–5	(Belgium) Club Brugge
Osterc 61', 63', 80'	Report	Claessens 10', 25'; Staelens 12' (pen.), 20', 42' (pen.)

Športni park Nova Gorica, Nova Gorica
Attendance: 2,580
Referee: Lucílio Batista (Portugal)

12 August 1997
19:45

PAOK (Greece)	5–3	(Slovakia) Spartak Trnava
Zagorakis 31'; Marangos 34', 45'; Frantzeskos 52'; Olivares 80'	Report	Ujlaky 21', 26'; Luhový 23'

Toumba Stadium, Thessaloniki
Attendance: 26,492
Referee: Fritz Stuchlik (Austria)

12 August 1997
22:00

KR (Iceland)	0–0	(Greece) OFI
	Report

KR-völlur, Reykjavík
Attendance: 1,900
Referee: Kurt Zuppinger (Switzerland)

12 August 1997
16:30

Jablonec (Czech Republic)	1–1	(Sweden) Örebro
Hromádko 20'	Report	Sahlin 66'

Stadion Střelnice, Jablonec nad Nisou
Attendance: 2,792
Referee: Livio Bazzoli (Italy)

12 August 1997
20:00

Apollon Limassol (Cyprus)	0–0	(Belgium) Mouscron
	Report

Tsirio Stadium, Limassol
Attendance: 6,070
Referee: Adrian Stoica (Romania)

12 August 1997
17:00

Dinamo Minsk (Belarus)	0–2	(Norway) Lillestrøm
	Report	Diallo 39', 74' (pen.)

City Stadium, Maladzyechna
Attendance: 1,212
Referee: Willie Young (Scotland)

12 August 1997
19:00

Újpest (Hungary)	0–0	(Denmark) AGF
	Report

Megyeri úti Stadion, Budapest
Attendance: 2,986
Referee: Sotiris Vorgias (Greece)

12 August 1997
17:00

Alania Vladikavkaz (Russia)	2–1	(Ukraine) Dnipro Dnipropetrovsk
Žutautas 18'; Ashvetia 56'	Report	Palyanytsya 7'

Republican Spartak Stadium, Vladikavkaz
Attendance: 32,000
Referee: Dermot Gallagher (England)

=== Second leg ===
26 August 1997
19:30

Malmö FF (Sweden)	0–2	(Croatia) Hajduk Split
	Report	Vučko 45'; Erceg 90'

Malmö Stadion, Malmö
Attendance: 6,462
Referee: Hartmut Strampe (Germany)

Hajduk Split won 5–2 on aggregate.

26 August 1997
18:00

Vorskla Poltava (Ukraine)	0–2	(Belgium) Anderlecht
	Report	Zetterberg 31'; Scifo 42'

Vorskla Stadium, Poltava
Attendance: 19,000
Referee: Georg Dardenne (Germany)

Anderlecht won 4–0 on aggregate.

26 August 1997
19:00

Viking (Norway)	2–1	(Switzerland) Neuchâtel Xamax
Skogheim 54'; Månsson 83'	Report	Kunz 48'

Stavanger Stadion, Stavanger
Attendance: 1,877
Referee: Miroslav Radoman (FR Yugoslavia)

Neuchâtel Xamax won 4–2 on aggregate.

26 August 1997
17:00

Odra Wodzisław (Poland)	3–4	(Russia) Rotor Volgograd
Staniek 35'; Zagórski 43'; Brzoza 44'	Report	Berketov 5'; Abramov 50'; Veretennikov 70', 72'

Stadion MOSiR, Wodzisław Śląski
Attendance: 3,500
Referee: René Temmink (Netherlands)

Rotor Volgograd won 6–3 on aggregate.

26 August 1997
20:30

Dundee United (Scotland)	1–1	(Turkey) Trabzonspor
McLaren 55'	Report	Hami 80'

Tannadice Park, Dundee
Attendance: 10,232
Referee: Kim Milton Nielsen (Denmark)

Trabzonspor won 2–1 on aggregate.

26 August 1997
18:15

Boby Brno (Czech Republic)	2–0	(Austria) Rapid Wien
Pacanda 3'; Valnoha 45'	Report

Stadion Za Lužánkami, Brno
Attendance: 6,350
Referee: Giorgos Bikas (Greece)

Rapid Wien won 6–3 on aggregate.

26 August 1997
21:00

Celtic (Scotland)	6–3	(Austria) Tirol Innsbruck
Donnelly 30', 63' (pen.); Thom 40'; Burley 69', 90'; Wieghorst 85'	Report	Mayrleb 35'; Larsson 42' (o.g.); Krinner 82'

Celtic Park, Glasgow
Attendance: 47,017
Referee: Knud Erik Fisker (Denmark)

Celtic won 7–5 on aggregate.

26 August 1997
19:00

Ferencváros (Hungary)	0–1 (a.e.t.)	(Sweden) Helsingborg
	Report	Jakobsson 42'
Penalties
Miriuță (penalty scored); Vincze (penalty missed); Zavadszky (penalty scored); Nyilas (penalty scored); Lipcsei (penalty scored)	3–4	(penalty scored) P. Ljung; (penalty missed) Jonson; (penalty missed) Nilsson; (penalty scored) Powell; (penalty scored) Wibrån

Üllői úti Stadion, Budapest
Attendance: 9,993
Referee: John Rowbotham (Scotland)

1–1 on aggregate. Ferencváros won 4–3 on penalties.

26 August 1997
18:00

Hapoel Petah Tikva (Israel)	1–0	(Denmark) Vejle
Kakoun 33'	Report

Petah Tikva Municipal Stadium, Petah Tikva
Attendance: 6,000
Referee: Graziano Cesari (Italy)

Hapoel Petah Tikva won 1–0 on aggregate.

26 August 1997
19:00

Brann (Norway)	2–0	(Switzerland) Grasshopper
Paldan 41', 44'	Report

Brann Stadion, Bergen
Attendance: 2,909
Referee: Karol Ihring (Slovakia)

Grasshopper won 3–2 on aggregate.

26 August 1997
20:00

Club Brugge (Belgium)	3–0	(Slovenia) Gorica
Jbari 4'; De Brul 80'; Van der Elst 82'	Report

Olympiastadion, Bruges
Attendance: 3,000
Referee: Metin Tokat (Turkey)

Club Brugge won 8–3 on aggregate.

26 August 1997
19:00

Spartak Trnava (Slovakia)	0–1	(Greece) PAOK
	Report	Zagorakis 79'

Štadión Spartaka, Trnava
Attendance: 15,850
Referee: Claude Colombo (France)

PAOK won 6–3 on aggregate.

26 August 1997
20:30

OFI (Greece)	3–1	(Iceland) KR
Anastasiou 10'; Mitić 65'; Papadopoulos 82' (pen.)	Report	Björnsson 41'

Theodoros Vardinogiannis Stadium, Heraklion
Attendance: 9,298
Referee: Veselin Bogdanov (Bulgaria)

OFI won 3–1 on aggregate.

26 August 1997
18:00

Örebro (Sweden)	0–0	(Czech Republic) Jablonec
	Report

Eyravallen, Örebro
Attendance: 3,096
Referee: Alan Snoddy (Northern Ireland)

1–1 on aggregate. Örebro won on away goals.

26 August 1997
20:00

Mouscron (Belgium)	3–0	(Cyprus) Apollon Limassol
Pierre 32', 66'; Vidović 53'	Report

Stadium Nord, Villeneuve-d'Ascq, France
Attendance: 9,250
Referee: Roy Helge Olsen (Norway)

Mouscron won 3–0 on aggregate.

26 August 1997
18:00

Lillestrøm (Norway)	1–0	(Belarus) Dinamo Minsk
Diallo 40'	Report

Åråsen Stadion, Lillestrøm
Attendance: 1,906
Referee: Alain Hamer (Luxembourg)

Lillestrøm won 3–0 on aggregate.

26 August 1997
19:00

AGF (Denmark)	3–2	(Hungary) Újpest
Rieper 28'; Hallum 53'; Sørensen 55'	Report	Sebők 31'; Z. Kovács 65'

Århus Idrætspark, Århus
Attendance: 5,900
Referee: Andrei Butenko (Russia)

AGF won 3–2 on aggregate.

26 August 1997
17:00

Dnipro Dnipropetrovsk (Ukraine)	1–4	(Russia) Alania Vladikavkaz
Sharan 23'	Report	Gakhokidze 3', 28'; Yanovsky 33'; Kobiashvili 44'

Meteor Stadium, Dnipropetrovsk
Attendance: 5,500
Referee: Karl-Erik Nilsson (Sweden)

Alania Vladikavkaz won 6–2 on aggregate.

== First round ==
Team 1	Agg.	Team 2	1st leg	2nd leg
Deportivo La Coruña (Spain)	1–2	(France) Auxerre	1–2	0–0
Wüstenrot Salzburg (Austria)	6–7	(Belgium) Anderlecht	4–3	2–4
PAOK (Greece)	2–1	(England) Arsenal	1–0	1–1
Widzew Łódź (Poland)	1–3	(Italy) Udinese	1–0	0–3
Maribor (Slovenia)	2–10	(Netherlands) Ajax	1–1	1–9
Lyon (France)	7–3	(Denmark) Brøndby	4–1	3–2
MPKC Mozyr (Belarus)	1–2	(Georgia (country)) Dinamo Tbilisi	1–1	0–1
Real Valladolid (Spain)	2–1	(Latvia) Skonto	2–0	0–1
Vitória Guimarães (Portugal)	1–6	(Italy) Lazio	0–4	1–2
Strasbourg (France)	4–2	(Scotland) Rangers	2–1	2–1
MTK (Hungary)	4–1	(Russia) Alania Vladikavkaz	3–0	1–1
Schalke 04 (Germany)	5–2	(Croatia) Hajduk Split	2–0	3–2
Bastia (France)	1–0	(Portugal) Benfica	1–0	0–0
Sion (Switzerland)	1–6	(Russia) Spartak Moscow	0–1	1–5
OFI (Greece)	4–2	(Hungary) Ferencváros	3–0	1–2
Sampdoria (Italy)	1–4	(Spain) Athletic Bilbao	1–2	0–2
Bordeaux (France)	0–1	(England) Aston Villa	0–0	0–1 (aet)
Steaua București (Romania)	2–1	(Turkey) Fenerbahçe	0–0	2–1
Rotor Volgograd (Russia)	6–1	(Sweden) Örebro	2–0	4–1
Jazz (Finland)	1–7	(Germany) 1860 Munich	0–1	1–6
Trabzonspor (Turkey)	5–6	(Germany) Bochum	2–1	3–5
Croatia Zagreb	9–4	(Switzerland) Grasshopper	4–4	5–0
Vitesse (Netherlands)	2–3	(Portugal) Braga	2–1	0–2
Rapid Wien (Austria)	2–1	(Israel) Hapoel Petah Tikva	1–0	1–1
Internazionale (Italy)	4–0	(Switzerland) Neuchâtel Xamax	2–0	2–0
Celtic (Scotland)	2–2 (a)	(England) Liverpool	2–2	0–0
Mouscron (Belgium)	1–6	(France) Metz	0–2	1–4
Twente (Netherlands)	2–2 (a)	(Norway) Lillestrøm	0–1	2–1
Beitar Jerusalem (Israel)	2–4	(Belgium) Club Brugge	2–1	0–3
Atlético Madrid (Spain)	4–1	(England) Leicester City	2–1	2–0
AGF (Denmark)	3–2	(France) Nantes	2–2	1–0
Karlsruhe (Germany)	3–2	(Cyprus) Anorthosis Famagusta	2–1	1–1

=== First leg ===
16 September 1997
21:00

Deportivo La Coruña (Spain)	1–2	(France) Auxerre
Djalminha 87'	Report	Diomède 71'; Guivarc'h 84'

Estadio Riazor, A Coruña
Attendance: 11,874
Referee: Georg Dardenne (Germany)

16 September 1997
18:35

Wüstenrot Salzburg (Austria)	4–3	(Belgium) Anderlecht
Klausz 31', 52'; Glieder 50', 63' (pen.)	Report	Yashchuk 32'; Goor 60'; Stoica 80'

Lehener Stadion, Salzburg
Attendance: 3,847
Referee: Dermot Gallagher (England)

16 September 1997
19:45

PAOK (Greece)	1–0	(England) Arsenal
Frantzeskos 61'	Report

Toumba Stadium, Thessaloniki
Attendance: 33,117
Referee: Manuel Díaz Vega (Spain)

16 September 1997
18:30

Widzew Łódź (Poland)	1–0	(Italy) Udinese
Bogusz 63'	Report

Widzew Łódź Stadium, Łódź
Attendance: 5,343
Referee: Éric Blareau (Belgium)

16 September 1997
17:30

Maribor (Slovenia)	1–1	(Netherlands) Ajax
Čeh 47'	Report	Litmanen 66'

Ljudski vrt, Maribor
Attendance: 4,922
Referee: Charles Agius (Malta)

16 September 1997
20:30

Lyon (France)	4–1	(Denmark) Brøndby
Kanouté 19'; Linarès 50'; Carteron 58'; Giuly 75'	Report	Daugaard 34' (pen.)

Stade de Gerland, Lyon
Attendance: 12,086
Referee: Livio Bazzoli (Italy)

16 September 1997
15:00

MPKC Mozyr (Belarus)	1–1	(Georgia (country)) Dinamo Tbilisi
Kushnir 50'	Report	Mujiri 42'

Yunost Stadium, Mazyr
Attendance: 5,900
Referee: Leslie Irvine (Northern Ireland)

16 September 1997
21:00

Real Valladolid (Spain)	2–0	(Latvia) Skonto
Juan Carlos G. D. 32' (pen.); Edu Manga 55'	Report

Estadio José Zorrilla, Valladolid
Attendance: 8,840
Referee: Pascal Garibian (France)

16 September 1997
22:00

Vitória Guimarães (Portugal)	0–4	(Italy) Lazio
	Report	Casiraghi 48'; Fuser 63'; Nedvěd 70'; Nesta 79'

Estádio D. Afonso Henriques, Guimarães
Attendance: 5,500
Referee: Roelof Luinge (Netherlands)

16 September 1997
21:00

Strasbourg (France)	2–1	(Scotland) Rangers
Baticle 45' (pen.), 61' (pen.)	Report	Albertz 50' (pen.)

Stade de la Meinau, Strasbourg
Attendance: 12,457
Referee: Alfredo Trentalange (Italy)

16 September 1997
19:00

MTK (Hungary)	3–0	(Russia) Alania Vladikavkaz
Illés 55'; Preisinger 69'; Lőrincz 88' (pen.)	Report

Hungária körúti Stadion, Budapest
Attendance: 1,500
Referee: Lawrence Sammut (Malta)

16 September 1997
20:30

Schalke 04 (Germany)	2–0	(Croatia) Hajduk Split
Goossens 7', 23'	Report

Parkstadion, Gelsenkirchen
Attendance: 53,250
Referee: Sergei Khusainov (Russia)

16 September 1997
20:30

Bastia (France)	1–0	(Portugal) Benfica
André 80'	Report

Stade Armand-Cesari, Furiani
Attendance: 9,025
Referee: Pierluigi Pairetto (Italy)

16 September 1997
19:00

Sion (Switzerland)	0–1	(Russia) Spartak Moscow
	Report	Kechinov 73'

Stade de Tourbillon, Sion
Attendance: 6,000
Referee: Fernand Meese (Belgium)

16 September 1997
20:30

OFI (Greece)	3–0	(Hungary) Ferencváros
Papadopoulos 21' (pen.); Kounenakis 56'; Nioplias 85'	Report

Theodoros Vardinogiannis Stadium, Heraklion
Attendance: 7,969
Referee: Vasyl Melnychuk (Ukraine)

16 September 1997
20:30

Sampdoria (Italy)	1–2	(Spain) Athletic Bilbao
Boghossian 74'	Report	Ríos 19'; Larrainzar 62'

Stadio Luigi Ferraris, Genoa
Attendance: 26,191
Referee: Ahmet Çakar (Turkey)

16 September 1997
20:30

Bordeaux (France)	0–0	(England) Aston Villa
	Report

Stade du Parc Lescure, Bordeaux
Attendance: 16,800
Referee: Armand Ancion (Belgium)

16 September 1997
20:45

Steaua București (Romania)	0–0	(Turkey) Fenerbahçe
	Report

Stadionul Steaua, Bucharest
Attendance: 16,000
Referee: Juan Fernández Marín (Spain)

16 September 1997
16:00

Rotor Volgograd (Russia)	2–0	(Sweden) Örebro
Burlachenko 45'; Veretennikov 63'	Report

Central Stadium, Volgograd
Attendance: 16,000
Referee: Giorgos Bikas (Greece)

16 September 1997
16:00

Jazz (Finland)	0–1	(Germany) 1860 Munich
	Report	Pele 90'

Tampereen stadion, Tampere
Attendance: 1,320
Referee: Alan Snoddy (Northern Ireland)

16 September 1997
18:00

Trabzonspor (Turkey)	2–1	(Germany) Bochum
Hami 22' (pen.); Çetin 45'	Report	Bałuszyński 1' (pen.)

Hüseyin Avni Aker Stadium, Trabzon
Attendance: 7,835
Referee: Jorge Coroado (Portugal)

16 September 1997
20:15

Croatia Zagreb	4–4	(Switzerland) Grasshopper
Šarić 22'; Viduka 41'; Prosinečki 58' (pen.); I. Cvitanović 78'	Report	Moldovan 20', 79'; Mladinić 62' (o.g.); Türkyilmaz 66'

Stadion Maksimir, Zagreb
Attendance: 20,148
Referee: Hartmut Strampe (Germany)

16 September 1997
21:15

Vitesse (Netherlands)	2–1	(Portugal) Braga
Čurović 33'; Trustfull 85' (pen.)	Report	Karoglan 90' (pen.)

Nieuw Monnikenhuize, Arnhem
Attendance: 5,264
Referee: Juan Brito Arceo (Spain)

16 September 1997
20:30

Rapid Wien (Austria)	1–0	(Israel) Hapoel Petah Tikva
Freund 37'	Report

Gerhard-Hanappi-Stadion, Vienna
Attendance: 10,000
Referee: Taras Bezubyak (Russia)

16 September 1997
20:45

Internazionale (Italy)	2–0	(Switzerland) Neuchâtel Xamax
Ronaldo 59'; Zé Elias 71'	Report

Stadio Giuseppe Meazza, Milan
Attendance: 15,225
Referee: Karl-Erik Nilsson (Sweden)

16 September 1997
21:05

Celtic (Scotland)	2–2	(England) Liverpool
McNamara 53'; Donnelly 74' (pen.)	Report	Owen 7'; McManaman 89'

Celtic Park, Glasgow
Attendance: 48,526
Referee: Graziano Cesari (Italy)

16 September 1997
20:00

Mouscron (Belgium)	0–2	(France) Metz
	Report	Meyrieu 21'; Rodriguez 25'

Stade Le Canonnier, Mouscron
Attendance: 6,700
Referee: Kurt Zuppinger (Switzerland)

16 September 1997
19:30

Twente (Netherlands)	0–1	(Norway) Lillestrøm
	Report	Diallo 25' (pen.)

Stadion Het Diekman, Enschede
Attendance: 7,514
Referee: Andreas Georgiou (Cyprus)

16 September 1997
17:00

Beitar Jerusalem (Israel)	2–1	(Belgium) Club Brugge
Pisont 46'; Sallói 50'	Report	Jbari 57'

Teddy Stadium, Jerusalem
Attendance: 8,000
Referee: Christer Fällström (Sweden)

16 September 1997
21:30

Atlético Madrid (Spain)	2–1	(England) Leicester City
Juninho Paulista 69'; Vieri 72' (pen.)	Report	Marshall 11'

Estadio Vicente Calderón, Madrid
Attendance: 28,000
Referee: Roy Helge Olsen (Norway)

16 September 1997
20:00

AGF (Denmark)	2–2	(France) Nantes
Piechnik 18'; Hallum 74'	Report	Gourvennec 12'; N'Diaye 24'

Århus Idrætspark, Århus
Attendance: 5,425
Referee: Miroslav Liba (Czech Republic)

16 September 1997
18:30

Karlsruhe (Germany)	2–1	(Cyprus) Anorthosis Famagusta
Régis 11'; Schroth 88'	Report	Charalambous 34'

Wildparkstadion, Karlsruhe
Attendance: 12,000
Referee: Adrian Stoica (Romania)

=== Second leg ===
30 September 1997
20:00

Auxerre (France)	0–0	(Spain) Deportivo La Coruña
	Report

Stade de l'Abbé-Deschamps, Auxerre
Attendance: 10,047
Referee: Nikolai Levnikov (Russia)

Auxerre won 2–1 on aggregate.

30 September 1997
20:30

Anderlecht (Belgium)	4–2	(Austria) Wüstenrot Salzburg
Peiremans 46', 63'; Yashchuk 55'; Dheedene 62'	Report	Glieder 5'; Ivanauskas 32'

Stade Constant Vanden Stock, Brussels
Attendance: 13,902
Referee: Václav Krondl (Czech Republic)

Anderlecht won 7–6 on aggregate.

30 September 1997
21:00

Arsenal (England)	1–1	(Greece) PAOK
Bergkamp 22'	Report	Vryzas 87'

Highbury, London
Attendance: 37,982
Referee: Michel Piraux (Belgium)

PAOK won 2–1 on aggregate.

30 September 1997
18:00

Udinese (Italy)	3–0	(Poland) Widzew Łódź
Bierhoff 2'; Poggi 7'; Locatelli 89'	Report

Stadio Friuli, Udine
Attendance: 28,016
Referee: John Rowbotham (Scotland)

Udinese won 3–1 on aggregate.

30 September 1997
20:30

Ajax (Netherlands)	9–1	(Slovenia) Maribor
Arveladze 1', 24', 79'; Litmanen 21'; Witschge 37'; Babangida 40'; F. de Boer 62'; Oliseh 84'; McCarthy 86'	Report	Ljubobratović 83'

Amsterdam Arena, Amsterdam
Attendance: 41,500
Referee: Aron Huzu (Romania)

Ajax won 10–2 on aggregate.

30 September 1997
20:05

Brøndby (Denmark)	2–3	(France) Lyon
Sand 5'; Daugaard 9' (pen.)	Report	Giuly 14' (pen.); Job 82'; Bardon 88'

Brøndby Stadion, Brøndbyvester
Attendance: 8,138
Referee: Juan Ansuátegui Roca (Spain)

Lyon won 7–3 on aggregate.

30 September 1997
16:00

Dinamo Tbilisi (Georgia (country))	1–0	(Belarus) MPKC Mozyr
Aleksidze 70'	Report

Boris Paichadze National Stadium, Tbilisi
Attendance: 15,200
Referee: Jan Wegereef (Netherlands)

Dinamo Tbilisi won 2–1 on aggregate.

30 September 1997
20:30

Skonto (Latvia)	1–0	(Spain) Real Valladolid
Miholaps 5'	Report

Daugava Stadium, Riga
Attendance: 2,000
Referee: Gylfi Orrason (Iceland)

Real Valladolid won 2–1 on aggregate.

30 September 1997
20:45

Lazio (Italy)	2–1	(Portugal) Vitória Guimarães
Signori 40'; Nedvěd 74'	Report	Paas 1'

Stadio Olimpico, Rome
Attendance: 5,281
Referee: Markus Merk (Germany)

Lazio won 6–1 on aggregate.

30 September 1997
20:45

Rangers (Scotland)	1–2	(France) Strasbourg
Gattuso 11'	Report	Baticle 35'; Zitelli 49'

Ibrox Stadium, Glasgow
Attendance: 40,145
Referee: Fritz Stuchlik (Austria)

Strasbourg won 4–2 on aggregate.

30 September 1997
16:00

Alania Vladikavkaz (Russia)	1–1	(Hungary) MTK
Moroz 16'	Report	Halmai 84'

Republican Spartak Stadium, Vladikavkaz
Attendance: 22,000
Referee: Willie Young (Scotland)

MTK won 4–1 on aggregate.

30 September 1997
16:00

Hajduk Split (Croatia)	2–3	(Germany) Schalke 04
Vulić 20'; Računica 34'	Report	Wilmots 21'; Eijkelkamp 67', 72'

Stadion Poljud, Split
Attendance: 11,847
Referee: Pierluigi Pairetto (Italy)

Schalke 04 won 5–2 on aggregate.

30 September 1997
22:30

Benfica (Portugal)	0–0	(France) Bastia
	Report

Estádio da Luz, Lisbon
Attendance: 20,817
Referee: László Vágner (Hungary)

Bastia won 1–0 on aggregate.

30 September 1997
20:30

Ferencváros (Hungary)	2–1	(Greece) OFI
Nychenko 70'; Horváth 85' (pen.)	Report	Nioplias 14'

Üllői úti Stadion, Budapest
Attendance: 7,697
Referee: Lutz Michael Fröhlich (Germany)

OFI won 4–2 on aggregate.

30 September 1997
20:30

Athletic Bilbao (Spain)	2–0	(Italy) Sampdoria
Larrazabal 41' (pen.); Ziganda 48'	Report

Estadio San Mamés, Bilbao
Attendance: 38,000
Referee: Marc Batta (France)

Athletic Bilbao won 4–1 on aggregate.

30 September 1997
20:45

Aston Villa (England)	1–0 (a.e.t.)	(France) Bordeaux
Milošević 111'	Report

Villa Park, Birmingham
Attendance: 33,072
Referee: Knud Erik Fisker (Denmark)

Aston Villa won 1–0 on aggregate.

30 September 1997
19:00

Fenerbahçe (Turkey)	1–2	(Romania) Steaua București
Bolić 63'	Report	Militaru 10'; Ciocoiu 44'

Şükrü Saracoğlu Stadium, Istanbul
Attendance: 25,210
Referee: Graham Poll (England)

Steaua București won 2–1 on aggregate.

30 September 1997
19:00

Örebro (Sweden)	1–4	(Russia) Rotor Volgograd
E. Karlsson 83'	Report	Niederhaus 25', 67'; Zernov 41'; Veretennikov 72' (pen.)

Eyravallen, Örebro
Attendance: 3,143
Referee: Syarhey Shmolik (Belarus)

Rotor Volgograd won 6–1 on aggregate.

30 September 1997
18:00

1860 Munich (Germany)	6–1	(Finland) Jazz
Winkler 33', 70'; Cerny 44'; Böhme 49'; Nowak 51'; Hamann 67'	Report	Méndez 83'

Olympiastadion, Munich
Attendance: 7,500
Referee: John McDermott (Republic of Ireland)

1860 Munich won 7–1 on aggregate.

30 September 1997
20:30

Bochum (Germany)	5–3	(Turkey) Trabzonspor
Stickroth 20'; Yuran 44', 51'; Dickhaut 60'; Peschel 68'	Report	Missé-Missé 30'; Ogün 73'; Osman 80'

Ruhrstadion, Bochum
Attendance: 24,500
Referee: Miroslav Radoman (FR Yugoslavia)

Bochum won 6–5 on aggregate.

30 September 1997
20:00

Grasshopper (Switzerland)	0–5	Croatia Zagreb
	Report	I. Cvitanović 25', 32', 89'; Prosinečki 86' (pen.), 90' (pen.)

Hardturm, Zurich
Attendance: 16,000
Referee: Metin Tokat (Turkey)

Croatia Zagreb won 9–4 on aggregate.

30 September 1997
19:00

Braga (Portugal)	2–0	(Netherlands) Vitesse
Artur Jorge 13' (pen.), 23' (pen.)	Report

Estádio 1º de Maio, Braga
Attendance: 11,000
Referee: Roger Philippi (Luxembourg)

Braga won 3–2 on aggregate.

30 September 1997
17:30

Hapoel Petah Tikva (Israel)	1–1	(Austria) Rapid Wien
Kakoun 34' (pen.)	Report	Penksa 72'

Petah Tikva Municipal Stadium, Petah Tikva
Attendance: 6,000
Referee: Marnix Sandra (Belgium)

Rapid Wien won 2–1 on aggregate.

30 September 1997
20:45

Neuchâtel Xamax (Switzerland)	0–2	(Italy) Internazionale
	Report	Moriero 26'; Ganz 70'

Stade de la Maladière, Neuchâtel
Attendance: 11,000
Referee: Ryszard Wójcik (Poland)

Internazionale won 4–0 on aggregate.

30 September 1997
21:00

Liverpool (England)	0–0	(Scotland) Celtic
	Report

Anfield, Liverpool
Attendance: 38,205
Referee: Edgar Steinborn (Germany)

2–2 on aggregate. Liverpool won on away goals.

30 September 1997
20:00

Metz (France)	4–1	(Belgium) Mouscron
Rodriguez 3', 25'; Kastendeuch 39'; Gaillot 89'	Report	Van Durme 9'

Stade Saint-Symphorien, Longeville-lès-Metz
Attendance: 7,485
Referee: Lucílio Batista (Portugal)

Metz won 6–1 on aggregate.

30 September 1997
18:00

Lillestrøm (Norway)	1–2	(Netherlands) Twente
Diallo 85' (pen.)	Report	Vennegoor of Hesselink 55' van Halst 89' (pen.)

Ullevaal Stadion, Oslo
Attendance: 3,437
Referee: Bernard Saules (France)

2–2 on aggregate. Twente won on away goals.

30 September 1997
20:00

Club Brugge (Belgium)	3–0	(Israel) Beitar Jerusalem
Jbari 65'; Fadiga 70'; Verheyen 80'	Report

Olympiastadion, Bruges
Attendance: 7,978
Referee: Robert Sedlacek (Austria)

Club Brugge won 4–2 on aggregate.

30 September 1997
20:45

Leicester City (England)	0–2	(Spain) Atlético Madrid
	Report	Juninho Paulista 72'; Kiko 88'

Filbert Street, Leicester
Attendance: 20,776
Referee: Rémi Harrel (France)

Atlético Madrid won 4–1 on aggregate.

30 September 1997
20:30

Nantes (France)	0–1	(Denmark) AGF
	Report	Piechnik 44'

Stade de la Beaujoire, Nantes
Attendance: 15,368
Referee: Manfred Schüttengruber (Austria)

AGF won 3–2 on aggregate.

30 September 1997
14:00

Anorthosis Famagusta (Cyprus)	1–1	(Germany) Karlsruhe
Mihajlović 11'	Report	Schepens 42'

Antonis Papadopoulos Stadium, Larnaca
Attendance: 4,500
Referee: Jan van Dijk (Netherlands)

Karlsruhe won 3–2 on aggregate.

15 October 1997
17:00

Spartak Moscow (Russia)	5–1	(Switzerland) Sion
Buznikin 14'; Titov 34'; Kechinov 41'; Tikhonov 60'; Romashchenko 83'	Report	Camadini 65'

Lokomotiv Stadium, Moscow
Attendance: 24,500
Referee: René Temmink (Netherlands)

The original 2nd leg game finished 2–2 (scorers: Shirko, Alenichev – Lota 2) on 30 September (Report), but had to be replayed because the goal posts were 8 cm short of the prescribed height.
Spartak Moscow won 6–1 on aggregate.

== Second round ==
Team 1	Agg.	Team 2	1st leg	2nd leg
Strasbourg (France)	3–2	(England) Liverpool	3–0	0–2
Internazionale (Italy)	4–3	(France) Lyon	1–2	3–1
Braga (Portugal)	5–0	(Georgia (country)) Dinamo Tbilisi	4–0	1–0
Schalke 04 (Germany)	3–1	(Belgium) Anderlecht	1–0	2–1
Ajax (Netherlands)	2–2 (a)	(Italy) Udinese	1–0	1–2
Club Brugge (Belgium)	2–4	(Germany) Bochum	1–0	1–4
Metz (France)	1–3	(Germany) Karlsruhe	0–2	1–1
Spartak Moscow (Russia)	4–1	(Spain) Real Valladolid	2–0	2–1
MTK (Hungary)	1–2	Croatia Zagreb	1–0	0–2
Atlético Madrid (Spain)	9–6	(Greece) PAOK	5–2	4–4
Steaua București (Romania)	3–3 (a)	(France) Bastia	1–0	2–3
Athletic Bilbao (Spain)	1–2	(England) Aston Villa	0–0	1–2
Rapid Wien (Austria)	4–2	(Germany) 1860 Munich	3–0	1–2
Rotor Volgograd (Russia)	0–3	(Italy) Lazio	0–0	0–3
AGF (Denmark)	1–1 (a)	(Netherlands) Twente	1–1	0–0
Auxerre (France)	5–4	(Greece) OFI	3–1	2–3

=== First leg ===
21 October 1997
21:05

Strasbourg (France)	3–0	(England) Liverpool
Zitelli 20', 64'; Conteh 70'	Report

Stade de la Meinau, Strasbourg
Attendance: 18,813
Referee: Vítor Melo Pereira (Portugal)

21 October 1997
20:45

Internazionale (Italy)	1–2	(France) Lyon
Ganz 71'	Report	Giuly 23'; Caveglia 82' (pen.)

Stadio Giuseppe Meazza, Milan
Attendance: 16,085
Referee: Peter Mikkelsen (Denmark)

21 October 1997
19:00

Braga (Portugal)	4–0	(Georgia (country)) Dinamo Tbilisi
Rodrigão 23'; Toni 54'; Karoglan 65'; Bruno 76'	Report

Estádio 1º de Maio, Braga
Attendance: 15,000
Referee: Aron Huzu (Romania)

21 October 1997
20:45

Schalke 04 (Germany)	1–0	(Belgium) Anderlecht
Thon 18'	Report

Parkstadion, Gelsenkirchen
Attendance: 56,240
Referee: Jorge Coroado (Portugal)

21 October 1997
20:30

Ajax (Netherlands)	1–0	(Italy) Udinese
Dani 28'	Report

Amsterdam Arena, Amsterdam
Attendance: 48,000
Referee: Urs Meier (Switzerland)

21 October 1997
19:00

Club Brugge (Belgium)	1–0	(Germany) Bochum
Jbari 79'	Report

Olympiastadion, Bruges
Attendance: 11,087
Referee: Karol Ihring (Slovakia)

21 October 1997
20:00

Metz (France)	0–2	(Germany) Karlsruhe
	Report	Häßler 13', 38'

Stade Saint-Symphorien, Longeville-lès-Metz
Attendance: 14,000
Referee: José María García-Aranda (Spain)

21 October 1997
17:00

Spartak Moscow (Russia)	2–0	(Spain) Real Valladolid
Tikhonov 61'; Titov 85'	Report

Lokomotiv Stadium, Moscow
Attendance: 10,000
Referee: Fritz Stuchlik (Austria)

21 October 1997
19:00

MTK (Hungary)	1–0	Croatia Zagreb
Lőrincz 81'	Report

Hungária körúti Stadion, Budapest
Attendance: 10,000
Referee: Giorgos Bikas (Greece)

21 October 1997
21:30

Atlético Madrid (Spain)	5–2	(Greece) PAOK
Vieri 10', 32', 53'; Lardín 12'; Kiko 74'	Report	Frantzeskos 20'; Marangos 65'

Estadio Vicente Calderón, Madrid
Attendance: 35,000
Referee: Karl-Erik Nilsson (Sweden)

21 October 1997
19:30

Steaua București (Romania)	1–0	(France) Bastia
Hrib 66'	Report

Stadionul Steaua, Bucharest
Attendance: 12,000
Referee: Ryszard Wojcik (Poland)

21 October 1997
21:30

Athletic Bilbao (Spain)	0–0	(England) Aston Villa
	Report

Estadio San Mamés, Bilbao
Attendance: 39,000
Referee: Hartmut Strampe (Germany)

21 October 1997
18:00

Rotor Volgograd (Russia)	0–0	(Italy) Lazio
	Report

Central Stadium, Volgograd
Attendance: 18,000
Referee: Juan Fernández Marín (Spain)

21 October 1997
18:30

AGF (Denmark)	1–1	(Netherlands) Twente
Mølby 41' (pen.)	Report	Sumiala 16'

Aarhus Idrætspark, Århus
Attendance: 7,353
Referee: Alain Hamer (Luxembourg)

21 October 1997
20:30

Auxerre (France)	3–1	(Greece) OFI
Sibierski 18'; Guivarc'h 50', 89'	Report	Nioplias 17'

Stade de l'Abbé-Deschamps, Auxerre
Attendance: 6,839
Referee: Miroslav Radoman (FR Yugoslavia)

22 October 1997
18:15

Rapid Wien (Austria)	3–0	(Germany) 1860 Munich
Stöger 44' (pen.); Schöttel 64'; Penksa 81'	Report

Ernst-Happel-Stadion, Vienna
Attendance: 26,500
Referee: Alain Sars (France)

=== Second leg ===
4 November 1997
21:00

Liverpool (England)	2–0	(France) Strasbourg
Fowler 63' (pen.); Riedle 84'	Report

Anfield, Liverpool
Attendance: 32,426
Referee: Rune Pedersen (Norway)

Strasbourg won 3–2 on aggregate.

4 November 1997
20:45

Lyon (France)	1–3	(Italy) Internazionale
Bąk 66'	Report	Moriero 9'; Cauet 47'; Coupet 69' (o.g.)

Stade de Gerland, Lyon
Attendance: 29,591
Referee: Bernd Heynemann (Germany)

Internazionale won 4–3 on aggregate.

4 November 1997
18:00

Dinamo Tbilisi (Georgia (country))	0–1	(Portugal) Braga
	Report	Toni 48'

Boris Paichadze National Stadium, Tbilisi
Attendance: 9,100
Referee: Alan Snoddy (Northern Ireland)

Braga won 5–0 on aggregate.

4 November 1997
18:00

Anderlecht (Belgium)	1–2	(Germany) Schalke 04
De Boeck 16'	Report	van Hoogdalem 58'; Wilmots 65'

Stade Constant Vanden Stock, Brussels
Attendance: 20,186
Referee: Robert Boggi (Italy)

Schalke 04 won 3–1 on aggregate.

4 November 1997
20:45

Udinese (Italy)	2–1	(Netherlands) Ajax
Poggi 25'; Bierhoff 32'	Report	Arveladze 81'

Stadio Friuli, Udine
Attendance: 38,912
Referee: Paul Durkin (England)

2–2 on aggregate. Ajax won on away goals.

4 November 1997
18:00

Karlsruhe (Germany)	1–1	(France) Metz
Häßler 35'	Report	Boffin 9'

Wildparkstadion, Karlsruhe
Attendance: 13,500
Referee: Graziano Cesari (Italy)

Karlsruhe won 3–1 on aggregate.

4 November 1997
21:00

Real Valladolid (Spain)	1–2	(Russia) Spartak Moscow
Juan Carlos G. D. 87'	Report	Shirko 63', 90'

Estadio José Zorrilla, Valladolid
Attendance: 16,700
Referee: Graham Poll (England)

Spartak Moscow won 4–1 on aggregate.

4 November 1997
20:00

Croatia Zagreb	2–0	(Hungary) MTK
Prosinečki 12', 55' (pen.)	Report

Stadion Maksimir, Zagreb
Attendance: 25,000
Referee: Antonio López Nieto (Spain)

Croatia Zagreb won 2–1 on aggregate.

4 November 1997
20:45

PAOK (Greece)	4–4	(Spain) Atlético Madrid
Frantzeskos 17'; Olivares 54'; Zagorakis 75' (pen.); Zouboulis 84'	Report	Lardín 2'; Bogdanović 28'; Santi 51'; Kiko 89'

Toumba Stadium, Thessaloniki
Attendance: 25,378
Referee: John Rowbotham (Scotland)

Atlético Madrid won 9–6 on aggregate.

4 November 1997
20:30

Bastia (France)	3–2	(Romania) Steaua București
Daye 52', 68'; Mendy 78'	Report	Munteanu 15', 40'

Stade Armand-Cesari, Furiani
Attendance: 10,000
Referee: Gerd Grabher (Austria)

3–3 on aggregate. Steaua București won on away goals.

4 November 1997
20:30

Aston Villa (England)	2–1	(Spain) Athletic Bilbao
Taylor 28'; Yorke 50'	Report	Javi González 70'

Villa Park, Birmingham
Attendance: 35,915
Referee: Sándor Piller (Hungary)

Aston Villa won 2–1 on aggregate.

4 November 1997
20:30

1860 Munich (Germany)	2–1	(Austria) Rapid Wien
Borimirov 5'; Winkler 23' (pen.)	Report	Zingler 69'

Olympiastadion, Munich
Attendance: 25,000
Referee: Roelof Luinge (Netherlands)

Rapid Wien won 4–2 on aggregate.

4 November 1997
20:00

Lazio (Italy)	3–0	(Russia) Rotor Volgograd
Casiraghi 5'; Mancini 34'; Signori 89'	Report

Stadio Olimpico, Rome
Attendance: 35,000
Referee: Ľuboš Micheľ (Slovakia)

Lazio won 3–0 on aggregate.

4 November 1997
18:00

Twente (Netherlands)	0–0	(Denmark) AGF
	Report

Diekman Stadion, Enschede
Attendance: 10,500
Referee: Marc Batta (France)

1–1 on aggregate. Twente won on away goals.

4 November 1997
20:00

OFI (Greece)	3–2	(France) Auxerre
Papadopoulos 57', 75' (pen.); Anastasiou 90'	Report	Guivarc'h 37'; Deniaud 60'

Theodoros Vardinogiannis Stadium, Heraklion
Attendance: 9,000
Referee: Mario van der Ende (Netherlands)

Auxerre won 5–4 on aggregate.

6 November 1997
18:00

Bochum (Germany)	4–1	(Belgium) Club Brugge
Donkov 12' (pen.), 55'; Yuran 84'; Wosz 90'	Report	Jbari 37'

Ruhrstadion, Bochum
Attendance: 23,900
Referee: Charles Agius (Malta)

Bochum won 4–2 on aggregate.

== Third round ==
The draw for the third round was held on 7 November 1997.

Team 1	Agg.	Team 2	1st leg	2nd leg
Strasbourg (France)	2–3	(Italy) Internazionale	2–0	0–3
Braga (Portugal)	0–2	(Germany) Schalke 04	0–0	0–2
Ajax (Netherlands)	6–4	(Germany) Bochum	4–2	2–2
Karlsruhe (Germany)	0–1	(Russia) Spartak Moscow	0–0	0–1 (aet)
Croatia Zagreb	1–2	(Spain) Atlético Madrid	1–1	0–1
Steaua București (Romania)	2–3	(England) Aston Villa	2–1	0–2
Rapid Wien (Austria)	0–3	(Italy) Lazio	0–2	0–1
Twente (Netherlands)	0–3	(France) Auxerre	0–1	0–2

=== First leg ===
25 November 1997
20:45

Strasbourg (France)	2–0	(Italy) Internazionale
Baticle 11'; Ismaël 19'	Report

Stade de la Meinau, Strasbourg
Attendance: 25,101
Referee: Sergei Khusainov (Russia)

25 November 1997
22:30

Braga (Portugal)	0–0	(Germany) Schalke 04
	Report

Estádio 1º de Maio, Braga
Attendance: 17,000
Referee: Mario van der Ende (Netherlands)

25 November 1997
20:45

Ajax (Netherlands)	4–2	(Germany) Bochum
Laudrup 34', 36'; Arveladze 38'; F. de Boer 45'	Report	Reis 20'; Wałdoch 24'

Amsterdam Arena, Amsterdam
Attendance: 48,200
Referee: Serge Muhmenthaler (Switzerland)

25 November 1997
19:00

Karlsruhe (Germany)	0–0	(Russia) Spartak Moscow
	Report

Wildparkstadion, Karlsruhe
Attendance: 12,500
Referee: Dick Jol (Netherlands)

25 November 1997
20:45

Croatia Zagreb	1–1	(Spain) Atlético Madrid
Mujčin 2'	Report	Caminero 61'

Stadion Maksimir, Zagreb
Attendance: 26,082
Referee: Kim Milton Nielsen (Denmark)

25 November 1997
19:45

Steaua București (Romania)	2–1	(England) Aston Villa
Ciocoiu 30', 32'	Report	Yorke 54'

Stadionul Steaua, Bucharest
Attendance: 19,500
Referee: Ľuboš Micheľ (Slovakia)

25 November 1997
20:45

Rapid Wien (Austria)	0–2	(Italy) Lazio
	Report	Casiraghi 38'; Mancini 61'

Ernst-Happel-Stadion, Vienna
Attendance: 26,000
Referee: Vítor Melo Pereira (Portugal)

25 November 1997
18:45

Twente (Netherlands)	0–1	(France) Auxerre
	Report	Diomède 70'

Diekman Stadion, Enschede
Attendance: 9,600
Referee: Terje Hauge (Norway)

=== Second leg ===
9 December 1997
20:45

Internazionale (Italy)	3–0	(France) Strasbourg
Ronaldo 28'; Zanetti 49'; Simeone 73'	Report

Stadio Giuseppe Meazza, Milan
Attendance: 45,560
Referee: Atanas Uzunov (Bulgaria)

Internazionale won 3–2 on aggregate.

9 December 1997
20:30

Schalke 04 (Germany)	2–0	(Portugal) Braga
Max 46'; Eijkelkamp 63'	Report

Parkstadion, Gelsenkirchen
Attendance: 56,824
Referee: Manuel Díaz Vega (Spain)

Schalke 04 won 2–0 on aggregate.

9 December 1997
18:00

Spartak Moscow (Russia)	1–0 (a.e.t.)	(Germany) Karlsruhe
Shirko 109'	Report

Central Dynamo Stadium, Moscow
Attendance: 28,000
Referee: Amand Ancion (Belgium)

Spartak Moscow won 1–0 on aggregate.

9 December 1997
21:30

Atlético Madrid (Spain)	1–0	Croatia Zagreb
Caminero 44'	Report

Estadio Vicente Calderón, Madrid
Attendance: 35,000
Referee: Markus Merk (Germany)

Atlético Madrid won 2–1 on aggregate.

9 December 1997
20:45

Aston Villa (England)	2–0	(Romania) Steaua București
Milošević 71'; Taylor 86'	Report

Villa Park, Birmingham
Attendance: 35,102
Referee: Bernd Heynemann (Germany)

Aston Villa won 3–2 on aggregate.

9 December 1997
20:15

Lazio (Italy)	1–0	(Austria) Rapid Wien
Venturin 85'	Report

Stadio Olimpico, Rome
Attendance: 10,030
Referee: Ryszard Wójcik (Poland)

Lazio won 3–0 on aggregate.

9 December 1997
20:00

Auxerre (France)	2–0	(Netherlands) Twente
Marlet 4'; Guivarc'h 78' (pen.)	Report

Stade de l'Abbé-Deschamps, Auxerre
Attendance: 11,756
Referee: Aron Huzu (Romania)

Auxerre won 3–0 on aggregate.

11 December 1997
20:30

Bochum (Germany)	2–2	(Netherlands) Ajax
Hofmann 58'; Mamić 69'	Report	Arveladze 52'; Dani 73'

Ruhrstadion, Bochum
Attendance: 20,034
Referee: Claude Colombo (France)

Ajax won 6–4 on aggregate.

== Quarter-finals ==
Team 1	Agg.	Team 2	1st leg	2nd leg
Internazionale (Italy)	2–1	(Germany) Schalke 04	1–0	1–1 (aet)
Ajax (Netherlands)	1–4	(Russia) Spartak Moscow	1–3	0–1
Atlético Madrid (Spain)	2–2 (a)	(England) Aston Villa	1–0	1–2
Lazio (Italy)	3–2	(France) Auxerre	1–0	2–2

=== First leg ===
3 March 1998
20:45

Internazionale (Italy)	1–0	(Germany) Schalke 04
Ronaldo 17'	Report

Stadio Giuseppe Meazza, Milan
Attendance: 44,889
Referee: Urs Meier (Switzerland)

3 March 1998
20:30

Ajax (Netherlands)	1–3	(Russia) Spartak Moscow
Arveladze 57'	Report	Shirko 26', 51'; Kechinov 84'

Amsterdam Arena, Amsterdam
Attendance: 40,000
Referee: Günter Benkö (Austria)

3 March 1998
21:30

Atlético Madrid (Spain)	1–0	(England) Aston Villa
Vieri 42' (pen.)	Report

Estadio Vicente Calderón, Madrid
Attendance: 45,000
Referee: Stefano Braschi (Italy)

3 March 1998
20:00

Lazio (Italy)	1–0	(France) Auxerre
Casiraghi 63'	Report

Stadio Olimpico, Rome
Attendance: 29,444
Referee: Michel Piraux (Belgium)

=== Second leg ===
17 March 1998
20:30

Schalke 04 (Germany)	1–1 (a.e.t.)	(Italy) Internazionale
Goossens 90'	Report	West 92'

Parkstadion, Gelsenkirchen
Attendance: 56,824
Referee: Gilles Veissière (France)

Internazionale won 2–1 on aggregate.

17 March 1998
18:00

Spartak Moscow (Russia)	1–0	(Netherlands) Ajax
Shirko 86'	Report

Central Dynamo Stadium, Moscow
Attendance: 32,000
Referee: Vítor Melo Pereira (Portugal)

Spartak Moscow won 4–1 on aggregate.

17 March 1998
20:45

Aston Villa (England)	2–1	(Spain) Atlético Madrid
Taylor 72'; Collymore 73'	Report	Caminero 28'

Villa Park, Birmingham
Attendance: 39,163
Referee: Mario van der Ende (Netherlands)

2–2 on aggregate. Atlético Madrid won on away goals.

17 March 1998
20:15

Auxerre (France)	2–2	(Italy) Lazio
Guivarc'h 39', 85'	Report	Mancini 7' (pen.); Gottardi 13'

Stade de l'Abbé-Deschamps, Auxerre
Attendance: 19,092
Referee: Antonio López Nieto (Spain)

Lazio won 3–2 on aggregate.

== Semi-finals ==
Team 1	Agg.	Team 2	1st leg	2nd leg
Internazionale (Italy)	4–2	(Russia) Spartak Moscow	2–1	2–1
Atlético Madrid (Spain)	0–1	(Italy) Lazio	0–1	0–0

=== First leg ===
31 March 1998
20:45

Internazionale (Italy)	2–1	(Russia) Spartak Moscow
Zamorano 45'; Zé Elias 90'	Report	Alenichev 48'

Stadio Giuseppe Meazza, Milan
Attendance: 57,803
Referee: Markus Merk (Germany)

31 March 1998
21:30

Atlético Madrid (Spain)	0–1	(Italy) Lazio
	Report	Jugović 33'

Estadio Vicente Calderón, Madrid
Attendance: 45,000
Referee: Paul Durkin (England)

=== Second leg ===
14 April 1998
17:30

Spartak Moscow (Russia)	1–2	(Italy) Internazionale
Tikhonov 12'	Report	Ronaldo 45', 76'

Central Dynamo Stadium, Moscow
Attendance: 36,600
Referee: Hugh Dallas (Scotland)

Internazionale won 4–2 on aggregate.

14 April 1998
20:45

Lazio (Italy)	0–0	(Spain) Atlético Madrid
	Report

Stadio Olimpico, Rome
Attendance: 37,036
Referee: László Vágner (Hungary)

Lazio won 1–0 on aggregate.

== Final ==
6 May 1998
20:45 CEST

Lazio (Italy)	0–3	(Italy) Internazionale
	Report	Zamorano 5'; Zanetti 60'; Ronaldo 70'

Parc des Princes, Paris
Attendance: 44,412
Referee: Antonio López Nieto (Spain)

== Top goalscorers ==
Rank	Name	Team	Goals
1	(Georgia (country)) Shota Arveladze	(Netherlands) Ajax	7
1	(France) Stéphane Guivarc'h	(France) Auxerre	7
3	(Scotland) Gary McSwegan	(Scotland) Dundee United	6
3	(Brazil) Ronaldo	(Italy) Internazionale	6
3	(Russia) Aleksandr Shirko	(Russia) Spartak Moscow	6
3	(Scotland) Robbie Winters	(Scotland) Dundee United	6
7	(Senegal) Mamadou Diallo	(Norway) Lillestrøm	5
7	(Belgium) Nordin Jbari	(Belgium) Club Brugge	5
7	(Croatia) Robert Prosinečki	Croatia Zagreb	5
7	(Russia) Oleg Veretennikov	(Russia) Rotor Volgograd	5
7	(Italy) Christian Vieri	(Spain) Atlético Madrid	5

== See also ==
- 1997–98 UEFA Champions League
- 1997–98 UEFA Cup Winners' Cup
- 1997 UEFA Intertoto Cup
