= 1994 Norwegian Football Cup =

Norgesmesterskapet i fotball for herrer

Tournament details
- Country: Norway
- Teams: 128 (main competition)

Final positions
- Champions: Molde (1st title)
- Runners-up: Lyn

Tournament statistics
- Matches played: 129
- Top goal scorer: Harald Brattbakk (10)

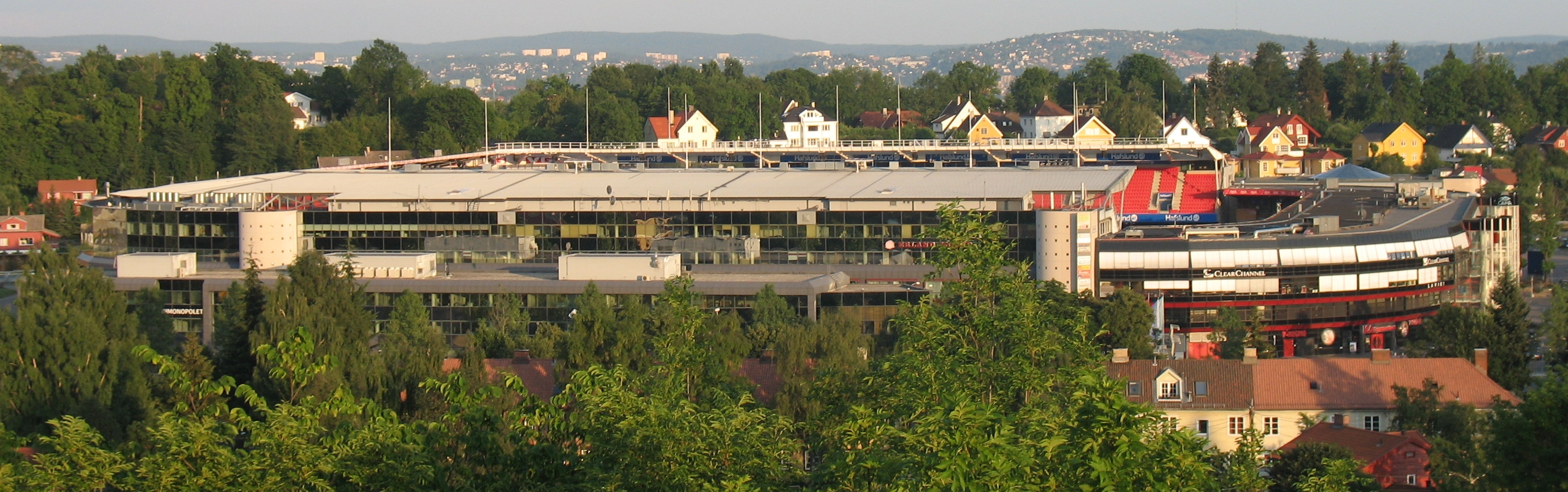
Ullevaal Stadion, Oslo - venue for the Norwegian Cup final

The 1994 Norwegian Football Cup was the 89th edition of the Norwegian Football Cup. The 1994 Norwegian Football Cup was won by Molde after they defeated Lyn in the final with the score 3–2. Both teams played in the 1. divisjon (Level 2) at the time.

== Calendar ==
Below are the dates for each round as given by the official schedule:

Round	Date(s)	Number of fixtures	Clubs
First Round	4 May 1994	64	128 → 64
Second Round	18–19 May 1994	32	64 → 32
Third Round	8 June 1994	16	32 → 16
Fourth Round	20 July 1994	8	16 → 8
Quarter-finals	17 August 1994	4	8 → 4
Semi-finals	3–11 September 1994	4	4 → 2
Final	23 October 1994	1	2 → 1

== First round ==
Team 1	Score	Team 2
3 May 1994
Skarbøvik	0–1	Hødd
Steinkjer	3–0	Nessegutten
4 May 1994
Alta	3–0	Skjervøy
Aurskog/Finstadbru	1–2	Drøbak/Frogn
Biri	1–4	Faaberg
Bjarg	0–5	Sogndal
Brattvåg	2–5 (a.e.t.)	Aalesund
Byåsen	2–3	Stjørdals/Blink
Egersund	3–2	Ulf-Sandnes
Eidsvold Turn	2–5	Jevnaker
Elverum	2–0	Tynset
Falk	0–1	Sprint-Jeløy
Fart	1–3	HamKam
Fauske/Sprint	0–3	Bodø/Glimt
Florvåg	1–2	Bjørnar
Florø	2–1	Volda
Follese	0–6	Brann
Fossum	2–3	Lørenskog
Fram Larvik	1–0	Mjøndalen
Gevir Bodø	2–2 (13–12 p)	Stålkameratene
Grei	1–3	Bærum
Grue	1–2	Mercantile
Hana	3–2	Kopervik
Harstad	6–0	Sortland
Haugesund	2–1	Vard Haugesund
Holmen	0–3	Strømmen
Kjelsås	4–5	Fredrikstad
Kolstad	1–1 (3–4 p)	Nardo
Kvamskameratene	0–10	Rosenborg
Kvik Halden	0–2	Sarpsborg FK
Lyngen/Karnes	0–3	Tromsdalen
Mandalskameratene	1–3	Klepp
Moss	2–0	Ørn-Horten
Narvik/Nor	1–0	Mjølner-Narvik
Nordlys	1–9	Tromsø
Nybergsund	1–2 (a.e.t.)	Kongsvinger
Nymark	4–4 (4–1 p)	Åsane
Odd	3–3 (5–4 p)	Snøgg
Odda	0–2	Fyllingen
Os	1–2	Fana
Randaberg	1–2	Viking
Rissa	0–5	Orkdal
Rælingen	0–6	Lillestrøm
Sandefjord BK	0–1	Strømsgodset
Selbak	2–3	Lyn
Skarp	1–2	Finnsnes
Stabæk	3–0	Holter
Stovnerkameratene	2–6	Vålerenga
Strindheim	0–1	Melhus
Sunndal	1–3	Åndalsnes
Surnadal	1–4	Molde
Sørumsand	3–2 (a.e.t.)	Liv/Fossekallen
Teie	2–6	Eik-Tønsberg
Ullern	0–1	Skeid
Vedavåg	1–6	Vidar
Vigør	1–4	Flekkefjord
Vindbjart	0–5	Start
Vuku	3–5	Verdal
Vågakameratene	0–3	Grovfjord
Ørsta	1–0	Langevåg
Øyestad	0–2	Pors
Ålgård	1–2	Bryne
Åssiden	2–1	Runar
5 May 1994
Råde	1–1 (4–5 p)	Ski

== Second round ==
Team 1	Score	Team 2
18 May 1994
Bjørnar	0–1	Fana
Melhus	1–0	Nardo
Narvik/Nor	1–0	Alta
Orkdal	5–3 (a.e.t.)	Steinkjer
Sprint-Jeløy	0–5	Moss
Verdal	0–6	Rosenborg
Åndalsnes	1–3 (a.e.t.)	Elverum
19 May 1994
Bryne	2–1 (a.e.t.)	Hana
Bærum	3–2 (a.e.t.)	Åssiden
Egersund	0–7	Start
Faaberg	2–7	Lillestrøm
Finnsnes	1–5	Bodø/Glimt
Flekkefjord	2–5	Viking
Florø	0–1	Sogndal
Fram Larvik	2–1	Strømsgodset
Fredrikstad	2–1	Drøbak/Frogn
Grovfjord	1–4	Tromsø
Haugesund	0–2	Fyllingen
Jevnaker	3–0	Strømmen
Klepp	2–1	Vidar
Lyn	2–0	Ski
Lørenskog	0–2	Kongsvinger
Mercantile	0–2	Stabæk
Nymark	0–4	Brann
Pors	0–1	Eik-Tønsberg
Sarpsborg FK	0–1 (a.e.t.)	Vålerenga
Skeid	1–3	Odd
Stjørdals-Blink	3–1	Gevir Bodø
Sørumsand	1–3	HamKam
Tromsdalen	2–0 (a.e.t.)	Harstad
Ørsta	1–8	Molde
Aalesund	1–2 (a.e.t.)	Hødd

== Third round ==
Team 1	Score	Team 2
8 June 1994
Eik-Tønsberg	1–2	Lyn
Fredrikstad	1–2	Lillestrøm
Fyllingen	0–1	Moss
HamKam	1–0 (a.e.t.)	Elverum
Hødd	4–0	Stjørdals/Blink
Jevnaker	1–0	Stabæk
Klepp	1–4	Brann
Melhus	0–1	Tromsø
Narvik/Nor	0–1	Rosenborg
Odd	1–0	Kongsvinger
Orkdal	1–2	Molde
Sogndal	2–1	Bærum
Start	4–1	Bryne
Tromsdalen	0–2	Bodø/Glimt
Vålerenga	2–0	Fram Larvik
Viking	9–0	Fana

== Fourth round ==
20 July 1994

Bodø/Glimt	1–2	Hødd
Berg 38'		Skotheim 66', 78'

Aspmyra Stadion, Bodø
Attendance: 2,792
Referee: Johnny Ditlefsen

20 July 1994

Brann	2–0	Vålerenga
Strandli 6'; Soltvedt 29'

Brann Stadion, Bergen
Attendance: 4,088
Referee: Jon Skjervold

20 July 1994

Lyn	2–0	HamKam
Skarsfjord 16'; Amundsen 44'

Ullevaal Stadion, Oslo
Attendance: 824
Referee: Tore Hollung

20 July 1994

Molde	4–3	Jevnaker
Klefstad 9', 25'; Fostervold 15'; Hestad 87'		Løhre 47', 67'; Bondehagen 64'

Molde Stadion, Molde
Attendance: 1,495
Referee: Svein G. Hermansen

20 July 1994

Moss	2–1	Viking
Johansen 24'; Nyhaug 40'		Medalen 73'

Melløs Stadion, Moss
Attendance: 1,947
Referee: Arild Thorp

20 July 1994

Rosenborg	5–1	Start
Hoftun 67'; Leonhardsen 71'; Løken 76'; Bergersen 81' (pen.); Brattbakk 85'		Belsvik 24'

Dalgård Idrettsanlegg, Trondheim
Attendance: 4,120
Referee: Rune Pedersen

20 July 1994

Sogndal	0–1	Odd
		Kolstad 61'

Fosshaugane, Sogndalsfjøra
Attendance: 1,493
Referee: Arild Haugstad

20 July 1994

Tromsø	2–0	Lillestrøm
Rushfeldt 17', 35'

Alfheim Stadion, Tromsø
Attendance: 2,563
Referee: Frode Kvam

== Quarter-finals ==
17 August 1994

Hødd	3–5 (a.e.t.)	Lyn
Sylte 35', 64'; Trones 57'		Eriksson 11', 92'; Tessem 37'; Fladmark 69'; Sørensen 106'

Høddvoll Stadion, Ulsteinvik
Attendance: 4,324
Referee: Terje Singsaas

17 August 1994

Molde	2–0	Tromsø
K. Rekdal 29' (pen.); Berg 43'

Molde Stadion, Molde
Attendance: 4,066
Referee: Terje Hauge

17 August 1994

Odd	1–4	Moss
Engh 69'		Olsen 9'; McManus 38'; Johansen 72'; Nyhaug 90'

Odd Stadion, Skien
Attendance: 6,732
Referee: Roy Helge Olsen

17 August 1994

Rosenborg	2–0	Brann
Skammelsrud 78'; Brattbakk 90'

Lerkendal Stadion, Trondheim
Attendance: 19,710
Referee: Arlid Thorp

== Semi-finals ==
=== First leg ===
3 September 1994

Molde	2–1	Rosenborg
Johnsen 73'; Stavrum 78'		Bergersen 40'

Molde Stadion, Molde
Attendance: 7,343
Referee: Rune Pedersen

4 September 1994

Lyn	2–0	Moss
Tessem 28', 66'

Ullevaal Stadion, Oslo
Attendance: 3,271
Referee: Thorbjørn Aass

=== Second leg ===
10 September 1994

Rosenborg	2–2	Molde
Brattbakk 31'; Kaasa 85'		Sundgot 20'; K. Rekdal 66'

Lerkendal Stadion, Trondheim
Attendance: 10,845
Referee: Sven Kjelbrott

Molde won 3–2 on aggregate.

11 September 1994

Moss	2–1	Lyn
Olsen 33'; Tangen 55' (pen.)		Amundsen 16'

Melløs Stadion, Moss
Attendance: 2,455
Referee: Jon Skjervold

Lyn won 3–2 on aggregate.

== Final ==
23 October 1994
13:15 CET (UTC+1)

Molde	3–2	Lyn
Jacobsen 12'; Sundgot 42'; Stavrum 48'	Report	Tessem 9'; Sørensen 59'

Ullevaal Stadion, Oslo
Attendance: 24,524
Referee: Terje Singsaas (Rosenborg)
