= Enberg =

Enberg is a surname. Notable people with the surname include:

- Alexander Enberg (born 1972), American actor
- Dick Enberg (1935–2017), American sportscaster
- Patrik Enberg (born 1994), Swedish ice hockey player
- Tom Enberg (born 1970), Finnish footballer

== See also ==
- Edberg (disambiguation)
