= 1995–96 Danish 1st Division =

51st season of Danish 1st Division

Danish 1st Division
- Season: 1995–96

The 1995–96 Danish 1st Division season was the 51st season of the Danish 1st Division league championship and the 10th consecutive as a second-tier competition governed by the Danish Football Association.

The division-champion and runner-up promoted to the 1996–97 Danish Superliga. The teams in the 13th to 16th spots relegated between the Danish 2nd Division East and West 1996-97.

== Table ==
Pos	Team	Pld	W	D	L	GF	GA	GD	Pts	Promotion or relegation
1	Hvidovre IF (C, P)	30	18	10	2	57	32	+25	64	Promotion to Danish Superliga
2	AB Copenhagen (P)	30	18	7	5	72	24	+48	61	Promotion to Danish Superliga
3	Brønshøj BK	30	16	4	10	56	40	+16	52	
4	Esbjerg fB	30	13	9	8	56	39	+17	48	
5	Herning Fremad	30	14	6	10	51	35	+16	48	
6	Svendborg fB	30	15	3	12	47	39	+8	40	
7	BK Fremad Amager	30	10	10	10	40	40	0	40	
8	B 93	30	9	10	11	40	47	−7	37	
9	Ølstykke FC	30	9	9	12	49	58	−9	36	
10	BK Avarta	30	9	9	12	37	47	−10	36	
11	Køge BK	30	9	8	13	51	59	−8	35	
12	FC Fredericia	30	9	8	13	51	59	−8	35	
13	Holstebro BK (R)	30	9	6	15	44	45	−1	33	Relegation to Danish 2nd Divisions
14	Hellerup IK (R)	30	7	12	11	34	51	−17	33	Relegation to Danish 2nd Divisions
15	B 1909 (R)	30	5	12	13	36	53	−17	27	Relegation to Danish 2nd Divisions
16	Nørre Aaby BK (Note: 8 points deducted?) (R)	30	6	5	19	30	87	−57	23	Relegation to Danish 2nd Divisions

Rules for classification: 1) points; 2) goal difference; 3) number of goals scored.
(C) Champions; (P) Promoted; (R) Relegated

== Top goalscorers ==
Position	Player	Club	Goals
1	Peter Lassen	AB Cph.	29
2	Thomas Ambrosius	Herning Fremad	19
3	Chris Hermansen	Esbjerg fB	17
4	Carsten Hallum	Hvidovre IF	16
-	Mukremin Jasar	B 93	16
6	Ole Pedersen	Svendborg fB	14
7	Mogens Nielsen	Esbjerg fB	13
8	Thomas Knudsen	Brønshøj BK	12

== See also ==
- 1995–96 in Danish football
- 1995–96 Danish Superliga
