= Pavlice =

Pavlice may refer to places:

- Pavlice, Trnava District, a municipality and village in Slovakia
- Pavlice (Znojmo District), a municipality and village in the Czech Republic
