= Kim Daugaard =

Danish footballer and coach (born 1974)

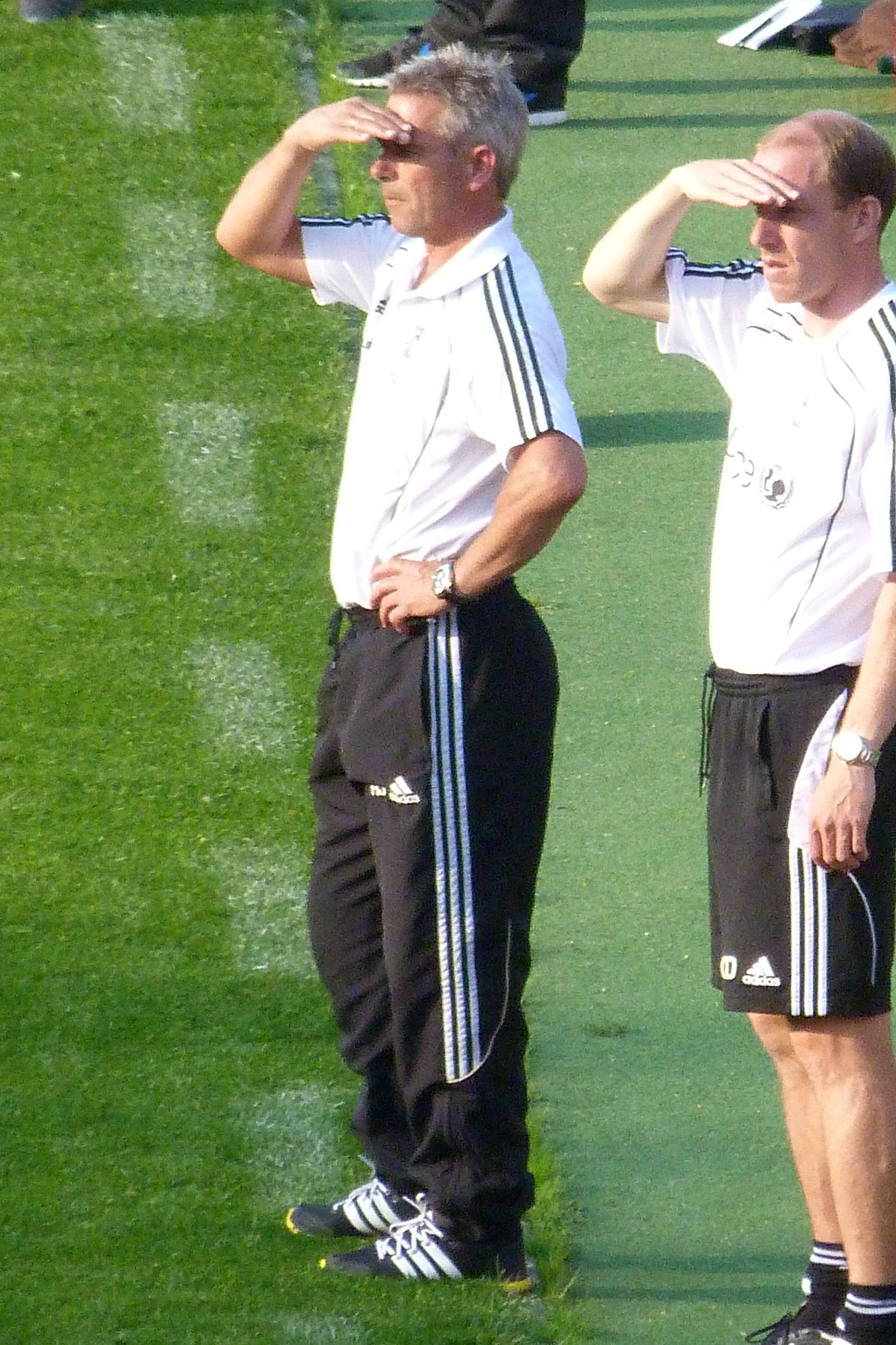
- Daugaard (right) as Assistant Coach at Bröndby IF in 2011

Personal information
- Full name: Kim Daugaard Hansen
- Date of birth: 29 March 1974 (age 52)
- Place of birth: Herfølge, Denmark
- Height: 1.80 m (5 ft 11 in)
- Position: Midfielder

Youth career
- Herfølge Boldklub
- Brøndby

Senior career*
Years	Team	Apps	(Gls)
1993–2008	Brøndby	336	(34)
2012–2013	Frederiksværk FK	1	(0)
Total		337	(34)

International career
1992–1993	Denmark U19	2	(0)
1994–1996	Denmark U21	17	(1)

Managerial career
- 2009–2011: Brøndby (assistant)
- 2012–2013: Frederiksværk FK (player-assistant)
- 2014–2016: HB Køge U19 (assistant)
- 2014–: HB Køge (assistant)
- 2023–2025: HB Køge
- 2025–: Hvidovre IF (assistant)
- * Club domestic league appearances and goals

Kim Daugaard Hansen (Danish pronunciation: [ˈtɑwˌkɒˀ]; born 29 March 1974) is a Danish football coach and former professional player, who currently works as assistant coach Hvidovre IF.

He played as a midfielder for Brøndby IF for his entire career. He played more than 450 games for the club, and won five Danish Superliga championships and five Danish Cup titles, and was named 1998 Brøndby IF Player of the Year. Daugaard played 17 games and scored one goal for the Danish under-21 national team from 1994 to 1996.

== Playing career ==
Daugaard played at youth level for Herfølge BK before moving to Brøndby IF, for whom he represented the Danish under-19 national team. He signed his first professional contract with Brøndby IF in January 1993, alongside under-19 national teammates Allan Ravn and Ole Puggaard. He made his senior debut for Brøndby on 3 July 1993, and made his Danish Superliga debut in April 1994. Daugaard was a part of the Brøndby team which won the 1994 Danish Cup. He was called up for the Danish under-21 national team in May 1994, and he went on to play 17 matches and score a single goal until July 1996.

He established himself in the Brøndby starting line-up during the 1995–96 Superliga season, under manager Ebbe Skovdahl. Daugaard only missed eight of 99 league games as Brøndby won three Danish Superliga championships in a row, from 1996 to 1998, as well as the 1998 Danish Cup, and he won the 1998 Brøndby IF Player of the Year award. He was called up for the Danish national league team, comprising the best players of the Danish Superliga, on a number of occasions, and played seven unofficial national league team games, scoring one goal, from January 1997 to February 2000.

When Åge Hareide was appointed new Brøndby manager in January 2000, and for the 2000–01 Superliga season, Daugaard received stiff competition from Swedish players Krister Nordin and Magnus Svensson. Daugaard eventually reclaimed his starting position in the 2003–04 Superliga season, under new coach Michael Laudrup. He played 31 of 33 games in the 2004–05 Superliga season, as Brøndby won the 2005 Superliga championship. With a goal in the 2005 Danish Cup final, he helped Brøndby win the Double that year. Daugaard helped Brøndby win the 2008 Danish Cup, before ending his career in the winter 2008. Daugaard played a total 466 games for Brøndby in all competitions, including 336 games and 34 goals in the Superliga.

== Coaching career ==
Between January 2009 og 1 September 2011, Daugaard worked as assistant coach for Brøndby IF. In July 2012, he became part of the coaching staff at Frederiksværk FK and officially became a playing assistant coach later that year.

== Honours ==
- Danish Superliga: 1995–96, 1996–97, 1997–98, 2001–02, 2004–05
- Danish Cup: 1993–94, 1997–98, 2002–03, 2004–05, 2007–08
- Brøndby IF Player of the Year: 1998
