= Allan Ravn =

Danish footballer (born 1974)

Personal information
- Full name: Allan Ravn Jensen
- Date of birth: 4 February 1974 (age 52)
- Place of birth: Solrød Strand, Denmark
- Height: 1.80 m (5 ft 11 in)
- Position: Midfielder

Senior career*
Years	Team	Apps	(Gls)
1993–2002	Brøndby	168	(8)
2002–2003	Landskrona BoIS		

International career
1990–1993	Denmark U-19	11	(0)
1993–1995	Denmark U-21	15	(1)

Managerial career
- 2007–2008: Herfølge Boldklub (talent coach)
- 2008–2010: Taastrup FC
- 2012–2014: Karlslunde
- 2019–2020: Frem
- * Club domestic league appearances and goals

Allan Ravn Jensen (born 4 February 1974) is a Danish former professional footballer. He made 235 appearances and won four Danish Superliga championships with Brøndby IF. He also played for Landskrona BoIS in Sweden. He played 15 games and scored one goal for the Danish under-21 national team from 1993 to 1995.

== Biography ==
Ravn started playing youth football with Solrød FC. He moved to multiple Danish champions Brøndby IF, and was called up for the Danish under-19 national team in October 1990. He made his Brøndby senior debut in the Danish Superliga championship in September 1993. In September 1993, he was called up for the Danish under-21 national team, and he went on to play 15 games and score one goal for the Danish under-21s.

He got his Brøndby break-through playing 30 of 33 games in the 1995–96 Danish Superliga which Brøndby won. He was a part of the Brøndby team that won three Superliga championships in a row from 1996 to 1998, as well as the 1998 Danish Cup trophy. However, the individual highlight of his Brøndby career was a 92 minute game winning solo goal against German team Bayern Munich in the 1999 UEFA Champions League. He played 22 of 33 games as he won his fourth Superliga title with Brøndby in the 2001–02 Danish Superliga season. When Brøndby hired new manager Michael Laudrup in 2002, Ravn was soon deemed surplus to requirement. He played his last Superliga game for Brøndby in November 2002. Ravn played a total 235 games for Brøndby in all competitions, including 168 games and eight goals in the Superliga championship.

Ravn signed a two-year contract with Swedish team Landskrona BoIS, while deciding to keep living in his hometown Solrød. He had his Landskrona contract annulled after just one season, as the time spent on travelling was making it hard for him to maintain a civil job on the side.

After his playing career, Ravn started a career in coaching. He began his managerial career as a talent coach for Herfølge Boldklub, and since worked as head coach for Taastrup FC, Karlslunde and Frem.

On 1 July 2020, Ravn became director of Fremad Amager.

== Honours ==
- Danish Superliga: 1995–96, 1996–97, 1997–98, 2001–02
- Danish Cup: 1997–98
