= Róbert Formanko =

Slovak footballer (1976–2000)

Personal information
- Date of birth: 29 January 1976
- Place of birth: Pavlice, Slovakia
- Date of death: June 23, 2000 (aged 24)
- Height: 1.82 m (6 ft 0 in)
- Position: Centre-back

Youth career
- –1993: Spartak Trnava

Senior career*
Years	Team	Apps	(Gls)
1993–2000	Spartak Trnava	110	(8)
2000	FC Petržalka	16	
- * Club domestic league appearances and goals

Róbert Formanko (1976 – 2000) was a Slovak footballer who played as a centre-back. He mostly played for FC Spartak Trnava. He played a total of 126 matches in the first tier of Slovak football.

== Early career ==
Formanko started playing football in neighboring Voderady, from where he joined the academy of Spartak Trnava as a teenager.

== Club career ==
Formanko debuted as a 17 year old in the first league in the 1993–94 season against FC Baník Prievidza. In the following season, he completed his military service in the second league team OD Trenčín. After returning to Trnava in the 1995–96 season, he scored his first league goal in a 3–1 win against FC Lokomotíva Košice. He scored in the final of the 1995–96 Slovak Cup, a 2–1 loss against Chemlon Humenné. He was a part of the Trnava squad that almost won the league in the 1996–97 season, when they lost the title to 1. FC Košice in a 1–0 away loss against MŠK Rimavská Sobota in the final round of the season. In the 1998–99 Cup Winners' Cup, his team played against Besiktas Istanbul, where he scored. Later that season, he scored in the second leg of the semi-final of the Slovak Cup at Pasienky against Inter Bratislava and in the final against 1. FC Košice where he sealed Trnava's 2–0 victory. He played his last match in a 4–1 win against Tatran Prešov. Altogether, he played 110 matches for Spartak in the Slovak First Football League and scored 8 goals.

In the winter of 1999, he transferred to Artmedia Petržalka, where he played the entire spring part of the 2000 season.

== Death ==
Formanko died in a car accident on 23 June 2000. While returning to his native Pavlíce, he crashed his Peugeot 306. According to a report by the Slovak Ministry of the Interior the vehicle went off the road and overturned several times.
