= Edberg (disambiguation) =

Stefan Edberg (born 1966) is a Swedish tennis player.

Edberg may also refer to:

- Edberg, Alberta, a village in Alberta, Canada

== People with the surname ==
- Alex Edberg (born 1991), Swedish speedway rider
- Nancy Edberg (1832–1892), Swedish swimmer, swimming instructor and bath house director
- Pelle Edberg (born 1979), Swedish professional golfer
- Per Jonas Edberg (1878–1957), Swedish politician
- Rolf Edberg (born 1950), Swedish retired ice hockey player
- Stephen J. Edberg (born 1952), American scientist at the Jet Propulsion Laboratory
