= Nordin Jbari =

Belgian footballer (born 1975)

Personal information
- Date of birth: 5 February 1975 (age 51)
- Place of birth: Saint-Josse-ten-Noode, Belgium
- Height: 1.82 m (6 ft 0 in)
- Position: Forward

Youth career
- 1986–1991: SCUP Jette
- 1991–1995: Anderlecht

Senior career*
Years	Team	Apps	(Gls)
1995–1996	Anderlecht	1	(0)
1996–1997	Gent	30	(14)
1997–1999	Club Brugge	36	(10)
1999–2003	Troyes	35	(4)
2001	→ Aris Thessaloniki (loan)	4	(1)
2003	→ Grenoble (loan)	6	(1)
2003–2004	Cercle Brugge	28	(11)
2004–2005	Gent	26	(6)
2005–2006	La Louvière	27	(2)
2007	Ethnikos Piraeus	3	(1)
Total		196	(46)

International career
1998	Belgium U18	1	(0)
1996–1997	Belgium U21	4	(2)
1996–1997	Belgium	2	(0)
- * Club domestic league appearances and goals

Nordin Jbari (born 5 February 1975) is a Belgian former professional footballer who played as a forward. He later became a football pundit on Belgian radio and television.

Jbari came through the youth system at Anderlecht and made his name at Gent, where he scored 14 league goals in the 1996–97 season. He won the Belgian league title with Club Brugge in 1997–98 and later played in France and Greece. In 1996 he became the first player of Moroccan descent to represent the Belgium national team, for whom he won two caps.

== Early life ==
Jbari was born in Saint-Josse-ten-Noode and grew up playing football in the streets there. His parents came from Morocco. After his family moved across Brussels, he joined SCUP Jette shortly before his 12th birthday. At 16, he was spotted by Anderlecht scouts Polyte Van den Bosch and Marcel De Corte.

== Club career ==
=== Anderlecht ===
Jbari trained with Anderlecht's first team from the age of 17. He made one league appearance in the 1995–96 season. In his first start, Celestine Babayaro was sent off after 20 minutes and Jbari spent most of the match at left-back. He did not get on with head coach Johan Boskamp and left the club in 1996.

=== Gent ===
Gent head coach Lei Clijsters brought Jbari to the club and promised him first-team football. Jbari scored 14 goals in 30 league matches in the 1996–97 season. Three months after joining Gent, he was called up by Belgium. He later named Clijsters as the coach who had influenced him most.

Benfica and Udinese both showed interest in Jbari in 1997. Benfica agreed a fee with Gent and terms with the player. Jbari instead chose Club Brugge, believing it gave him a better chance of a place in Belgium's squad for the 1998 FIFA World Cup.

=== Club Brugge ===
Club Brugge won the 1997–98 league title by a wide margin. Jbari scored five goals in 23 league matches that season. He also scored in both legs of a UEFA Cup tie against VfL Bochum, which Club Brugge lost.

Jbari fell out with head coach Eric Gerets. Gerets once followed Jbari's car after a match to check that he was going home rather than out in Brussels. Although he had signed a five-year contract, Jbari told the club to find another striker and left in 1999. He later called the decision a mistake.

=== Troyes, Aris and Grenoble ===
Jbari joined French Division 1 club Troyes in 1999. He clashed with head coach Alain Perrin, who he said insulted his players. He scored four goals in 33 league matches over two and a half seasons. He spent part of the 2001–02 season with Greek club Aris Thessaloniki and scored once in four league matches. Jbari later described his time in Thessaloniki as the best experience of his career, citing the atmosphere and the rivalry with PAOK.

He returned to Troyes for the 2002–03 season and made two more league appearances. In early 2003, he joined Ligue 2 club Grenoble. He scored once in six matches for Grenoble.

=== Cercle Brugge ===
In the summer of 2003, Jbari signed a one-year contract with newly promoted Cercle Brugge after a trial. He scored 11 goals in 28 league matches and finished the season as Cercle's top scorer. Jbari felt he was overlooked for Belgium despite his goals because he played for a mid-table side.

=== Return to Gent and La Louvière ===
Jbari returned to Gent in 2004. He started both legs of Gent's Intertoto Cup second-round tie against Vardar in July 2004. Gent were knocked out on penalties. He scored six goals in 26 league matches that season.

In 2005, he joined La Louvière. It was his first spell at a French-speaking club. He later called the season horrible, describing a weak squad and a climate of constant suspicion. He stopped playing with ten matches remaining and retired at the age of 31. He made a brief comeback in the 2006–07 season with Greek second-tier club Ethnikos Piraeus and scored once in three matches.

== International career ==
Wilfried Van Moer gave Jbari his first call-up to the Belgium squad. He made his debut on 14 December 1996 in Brussels, coming on for the final 15 minutes of a 3–0 defeat to the Netherlands in qualifying for the 1998 World Cup. His second and last cap came on 11 February 1997, when he played about ten minutes of a 3–0 friendly defeat to Northern Ireland in Belfast.

Jbari was the first player of Moroccan descent to represent Belgium, more than a decade before Marouane Fellaini and Nacer Chadli. He recalled that a television commentator introduced him as "Jbari the immigrant" in his first interview as an international, even though he was born in Belgium.

== Media career ==
After retiring, Jbari became a football pundit on radio and television. He worked as a consultant for Belgacom TV. He has appeared as an analyst on RTBF's Complètement Foot. He also comments on Club Brugge in the Flemish press.

== Honours ==
Club Brugge

- Belgian First Division: 1997–98
