= Zdeněk Valnoha =

Czech footballer

Personal information
- Date of birth: 8 May 1973 (age 53)
- Place of birth: Brno, Czechoslovakia
- Position: Midfielder

Senior career*
Years	Team	Apps	(Gls)
1993–1998	FC Boby Brno	125	(21)
1999	1. FK Příbram	15	(1)
1999–2001	FK Drnovice	52	(2)
2001–2002	1. FC Brno	37	(4)
2003	SK Dolní Kounice	13	(0)
2003	MFK Ružomberok	4	(0)
2004	1. SC Znojmo		(3)
2004–2005	Olympiakos Nicosia	21	(1)
2005	1. SC Znojmo		(1)
2006	TJ Sokol Tasovice		
2007	ENTHOI Lakatamia	10	(3)
2007–2008	Atromitos Yeroskipou	25	(1)

International career
1994–1996	Czech Republic U21	5	(0)
- * Club domestic league appearances and goals

Zdeněk Valnoha (born 8 May 1973) is a Czech football midfielder. He made over 200 appearances in the Gambrinus liga. He also played in the top leagues in Slovakia and Cyprus. Valnoha played international football at under-21 level for Czech Republic U21.
