= Anatoli Lukianchikov =

Moldovan footballer

Personal information
- Date of birth: 28 February 1975 (age 51)
- Place of birth: Tiraspol
- Position: Forward

Senior career*
Years	Team	Apps	(Gls)
1991–1997	Tiligul Tiraspol		
1998	FC Kryvbas Kryvyi Rih		
1998–1999	Tiligul Tiraspol		
2000–2001	FC Spartak Nalchik		
2002	FK Ventspils		
2003	Luch-Energiya		
2003	FK Ventspils		
2004	FC Okzhetpes		
2005	Tiligul Tiraspol		

International career
- Moldova u-21
- * Club domestic league appearances and goals

Anatoli Lukianchikov (born 28 February 1975) is a retired Moldovan football striker.
