= Vladimír Chaloupka =

Czech footballer

Personal information
- Date of birth: 25 January 1976 (age 50)
- Place of birth: Czechoslovakia
- Positions: Midfielder; forward

Senior career*
| Years | Team | Apps | (Gls) |
| 1993–1998 | Boby Brno | 53 | (4) |
| 1996 | → Uherské Hradiště (loan) | 10 | (0) |
| 1998–2001 | Jablonec | 39 | (2) |
| 2001 | → Plzeň (loan) | 5 | (0) |

International career
| 1993–1994 | Czech Republic U18 | 5 | (3) |
| 1997 | Czech Republic U21 | 3 | (1) |
- * Club domestic league appearances and goals

Vladimír Chaloupka (born 25 January 1976) is a Czech footballer who played as a midfielder and forward. He made over 100 appearances in the Czech First League between 1993 and 2001.
