= Stephen J. Edberg =

American scientist (born 1952)

Stephen J. Edberg (born 1952) is a retired scientist formerly at NASA's Jet Propulsion Laboratory. He is known for promoting collaborative efforts between amateur and professional astronomers. A professional astronomer since 1970, Edberg still considers himself to be an active amateur astronomer as well and is an active astronomical observer, photographer, and telescope maker. His pre-retirement career closed serving as staff astronomer for the Solar System Exploration website posted by NASA Headquarters and as staff scientist for earth science communication and for exoplanet Exploration communication.

During his college (University of California, Santa Cruz) and graduate school (University of California, San Diego and UCLA) years, he observed the Sun at observatories in Colorado, Arizona, California, Hawaii, and New Mexico, studying magnetic fields in active regions, prominences, and the solar corona. He also investigated extragalactic objects from Siding Spring Observatory and the Australian National Radio Astronomy Observatory. He began working full-time at San Fernando Observatory in 1978 before moving to NASA’s Jet Propulsion Laboratory in 1979.

While a project Investigation Scientist at JPL, he has worked on Galileo, Cassini, Comet Rendezvous/Asteroid Flyby, and also as System Scientist and Science Office Manager on the Space Interferometry Mission. His experience includes the science aspects of a space project from early development through flight operations. He has specified science requirements for spacecraft early in the design phase, coordinated competing science investigations during the planning stages, and has planned and prepared instruction sets for measurements executed by robotic spacecraft in flight.

Edberg organized and led the Amateur Observation Network of NASA’s International Halley Watch (IHW). He was responsible for engaging the amateur community, creating a guide on how to make scientific observations and standardized forms for submitting data, and publishing the data acquired by the amateur community.

Until his retirement from the organization in 2014, Edberg served as Executive Director of non-profit Riverside Telescope Makers Conference, Inc., leading the team that brings the annual RTMC Astronomy Expo, held each May in Big Bear, California, to hundreds of amateur astronomers from across the western USA and beyond from 1993-2014.

Edberg has a strong interest in bringing astronomy into the classroom and has published numerous classroom activities related to planetary science, space science, and astronomy. This includes NASA Educational Briefs and other activities found at Practical Uses of Math and Science. Edberg is also a credentialed part-time vocational teacher in Aerospace Studies in California, having taught astronomy at La Cañada High School for about 20 years starting in 1993.

Edberg’s photography, research, instruments, and writing have appeared in Solar Physics, The Astrophysical Journal, Space Science Reviews, and in other professional journals, NASA Facts, and in Sky and Telescope, Astronomy, Telescope Making, Griffith Observer, Sky and Space, Journal of the British Astronomical Association, Weather, Rangefinder, and other periodicals, and in several books including Collins’ how to identify Night Sky, Wild Guide Night Sky, Collins Guide to the Night Sky, and Gem Weather Photoguide. He co-authored with David H. Levy Observing Comets, Asteroids, Meteors, and the Zodiacal Light, published by Cambridge University Press.

In 1987 he was honored by the International Astronomical Union with the naming of Minor planet 3672 Stevedberg (1985 QQ) for his long commitment in bringing amateur and professional astronomers together. The citation was prepared by David H. Levy at the request of the discoverer Edward Bowell of Lowell Observatory. Edberg has been awarded a NASA Exceptional Service Medal and JPL Award for Excellence for his work in outreach. Carter Observatory in New Zealand named him Carter Memorial Lecturer in 2001 and he was an American Institute of Aeronautics and Astronautics Distinguished Lecturer from 1996-2003.
