= Ola Nilsson =

Swedish footballer

Ola Nilsson (born 22 August 1973) is a Swedish former football player who spent his entire professional career with Helsingborgs IF. He was a central defender.

He joined the club in 1991, leaving his native IFÖ/Bromölla IF. From day one of his spell at HIF, he was a first team regular and in 1992, when the club was re-promoted to Allsvenskan after 24 years in lower divisions, Ola Nilsson formed the backbone of the team together with other HIF stars, such as Mats Magnusson and Henrik Larsson.

In all, Ola Nilsson made 225 appearances for HIF in Allsvenskan, before he announced his retirement after the 2002 season. He was an indispensable part of the 1999 Championship winning team as well as of the 2000 Champions League team.

Ola Nilsson was, and still remains, a very popular figure among the Helsingborgs IF fans. After he retired, he served three years as a board member of the club, but he now works in a bank. He is married to Malin and they have two children.
