= Odd Arne Espevoll =

Norwegian footballer (born 1976)

Personal information
- Date of birth: 5 June 1976 (age 50)
- Position: Defender

Youth career
- Vindafjord

Senior career*
Years	Team	Apps	(Gls)
1994–2003	Viking	101	(3)
2001	→ Haugesund (loan)	28	(4)
2004	Hinna		
2005–?	Jarl		

International career
1996–1998	Norway U21	8	(0)

Managerial career
- 2023–: Jarl
- * Club domestic league appearances and goals

Odd Arne Espevoll (born 5 June 1976) is a retired Norwegian football defender.

He hails from Vikedal and started his career in Vindafjord IL. He made his debut for Viking FK in late 1994 and remained there through 2003, except the season 2001 when he was loaned out to FK Haugesund. In 2004 he joined Hinna, then Jarl.

Espevoll was capped for Norway on under-21 level. He participated in the bronze medal-winning squad at the 1998 UEFA European Under-21 Championship.

Ahead of the 2023 season he was announced as the new coach of Jarl.
