= Dragan Vulević =

Serbian footballer

Personal information
- Full name: Dragan Vulević
- Date of birth: 13 December 1970 (age 55)
- Place of birth: Prijepolje, SFR Yugoslavia
- Height: 1.82 m (5 ft 11 1/2 in)
- Position: Forward

Senior career*
Years	Team	Apps	(Gls)
1993–1996	Mladost Lučani	16+	(8+)
1996–1997	Red Star Belgrade	14	(6)
1997	Vojvodina	15	(7)
1998–2000	Albacete	70	(16)
2000–2001	Panionios	11	(3)
2001–2002	Borac Čačak	13	(6)
2002–2003	Radnički Obrenovac	13	(1)
2006–2008	Sevojno	44	(15)
2008–2009	Novi Pazar	9	(2)
2009	→ Sloga Bajina Bašta (loan)		
2009–2010	FAP	11	(1)
Total		216	(65)

Managerial career
- 2017-2018: Polimlje
- * Club domestic league appearances and goals

Dragan Vulević (Serbian Cyrillic: Драган Вулевић; born 13 December 1970) is a Serbian former professional footballer who played as a forward.

During his journeyman career, Vulević represented Mladost Lučani, Red Star Belgrade, Vojvodina, Albacete, Panionios, Borac Čačak, Radnički Obrenovac, Sevojno, Novi Pazar, Sloga Bajina Bašta, and FAP.

== Honours ==
Red Star Belgrade

- FR Yugoslavia Cup: 1996–97
