= Kenneth Trones =

Norwegian footballer (born 1969)

Personal information
- Full name: Kenneth Trones
- Date of birth: 19 April 1969 (age 57)
- Height: 1.86 m (6 ft 1 in)
- Position: Defender

Senior career*
Years	Team	Apps	(Gls)
1988–1989	Fauske/Sprint		
- Bodø/Glimt
1991	Fauske/Sprint		
1992–1995	Hødd		
1996	Lyn	3	(0)
- Bærum
- Lørenskog
- * Club domestic league appearances and goals

Kenneth Trones (born 19 April 1969) is a Norwegian football defender.

He played for FK Fauske/Sprint, then for FK Bodø-Glimt, then for Fauske/Sprint again from 1991. From 1992 he played for IL Hødd. He participated in their promotion to the highest level after the 1994 season. In 1996, he went to SFK Lyn. He only got three games for the club. He later played for Bærum SK and Lørenskog IF before moving back to Fauske Municipality.
