= Radovan Hromádko =

Czech footballer

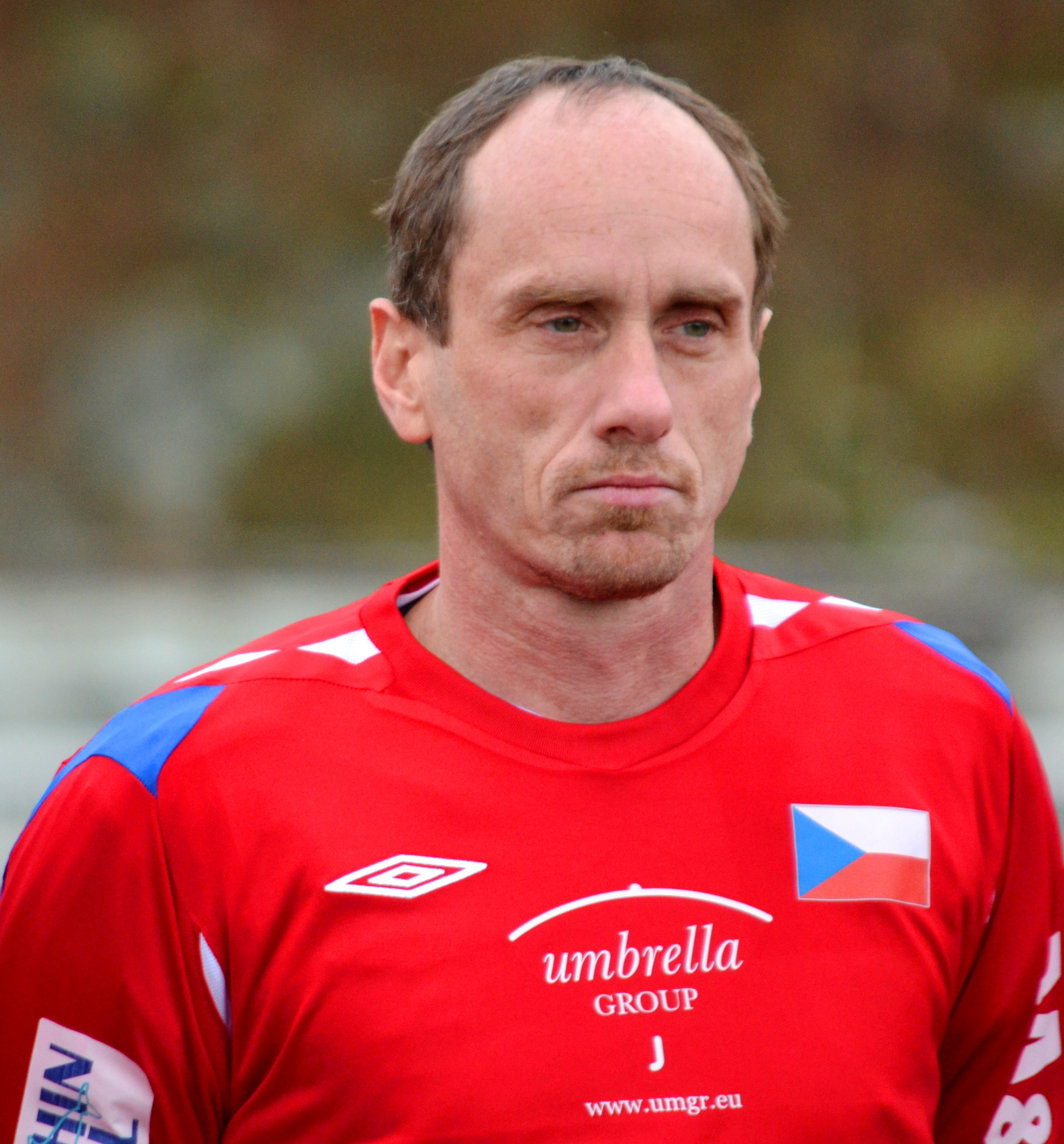
- Radovan Hromádko (2013)

Personal information
- Date of birth: 16 May 1969 (age 57)
- Place of birth: Náchod, Czechoslovakia
- Height: 1.92 m (6 ft 4 in)
- Position: Forward

Senior career*
Years	Team	Apps	(Gls)
1991–1998	FK Jablonec	109	(26)
1998–1999	Maccabi Haifa F.C.	23	(5)
1999–2001	FK Viktoria Žižkov	19	(3)
2001-2002	FK Pardubice		
2002	SK Semily		

International career
1995–1996	Czech Republic	2	(0)
- * Club domestic league appearances and goals

Radovan Hromádko (born 16 May 1969 in Náchod) is a Czech former football player. He played club football for seven years at Jablonec, where he made 109 league appearances, scoring 26 times. He also played international football for the Czech Republic. He made two appearances for the national team, making his debut against Kuwait on 13 December 1995.
