= Peter Knudsen (footballer, born 1973) =

Danish footballer (born 1973)

Personal information
- Full name: Peter Nørklit Knudsen
- Date of birth: 14 April 1973 (age 53)
- Place of birth: Glostrup
- Position: Midfielder

Senior career*
Years	Team	Apps	(Gls)
1991–1998	AB		
1998–1999	AS Bari		
1999–2002	AB		
2002–2004	Ølstykke FC		
2005	AB		
2005–2006	Stenløse BK		
- * Club domestic league appearances and goals

Peter Nørklit Knudsen (born 14 April 1973) is a Danish retired football midfielder. Besides Denmark, he has played in Italy. He started his professional career at the Danish football club AB, but was sold to the Italian club AS Bari in 1998.
