= Rune Buer Johansen =

Norwegian footballer (born 1973)

Personal information
- Date of birth: September 4, 1973 (age 53)
- Height: 1.77 m (5 ft 10 in)
- Position: Midfielder

Team information
- Current team: Nybergsund
- Number: 8

Senior career*
Years	Team	Apps	(Gls)
- Trømborg
- Askim
1995-1998	Sogndal	59	(7)
1996	Moss	15	(1)
1999-2000	Kongsvinger	31	(4)
2001-2003	Sogndal	46	(6)
2004-2006	Ham-Kam	22	(2)
2007-2009	Nybergsund		

International career
2004	Norway	1	(0)
- * Club domestic league appearances and goals

Rune Buer Johansen (born 4 September 1973) is a Norwegian footballer.
