= Krzysztof Zagórski =

Polish footballer

Krzysztof Zagorski
Personal information
- Date of birth: 4 February 1967 (age 59)
- Place of birth: Knurow, Poland
- Height: 1.77 m (5 ft 10 in)
- Position: Forward

Senior career*
Years	Team	Apps	(Gls)
1983–1984	MKS Czerwionka		
1984–1988	Concordia Knurów		
1988–1994	Górnik Zabrze	154	(22)
1994	Siarka Tarnobrzeg		
1995	FSV Zwickau	8	(0)
1995–1996	Siarka Tarnobrzeg	34	(5)
1996–1998	Odra Wodzisław	54	(12)
1998–1999	Podbeskidzie Bielsko-Biała		
1999–2002	Concordia Knurów		
1999	→ Dyskobolia Grodzisk Wielkopolski (loan)	4	(1)
2002–2003	Piast Gliwice		
2003–2004	GKS Jastrzębie		

Managerial career
- 2002–2003: Piast Gliwice (player-manager)
- * Club domestic league appearances and goals

Krzysztof Zagorski (born 4 February 1967) is a Polish former professional footballer who played as a forward.
