= Patrik Enberg =

Swedish ice hockey player

- Born: June 11, 1994 (age 31) Arvidsjaur, Sweden
- Height: 5 ft 10 in (178 cm)
- Weight: 176 lb (80 kg; 12 st 8 lb)
- Position: Left wing
- Shot: Left
- Played for: Skellefteå AIK
- Playing career: 2013–2024

Patrik Enberg (born June 11, 1994) is a Swedish former professional ice hockey player. He played two games with Skellefteå AIK of the Swedish Hockey League (SHL).

Enberg made his Swedish Hockey League debut playing with Skellefteå AIK during the 2013–14 SHL season.
