= František Hadviger =

Slovak footballer

Personal information
- Date of birth: 6 August 1970 (age 56)
- Position: Midfielder

Senior career*
Years	Team	Apps	(Gls)
1993–1994	FC Spartak Trnava		
1994–1995	FC Svit Zlin		
1996–1998	FC Spartak Trnava		
1998	1. FC Tatran Prešov		
1999–2000	ZTS Dubnica		
2000–2001	FC Spartak Trnava		
2002	FC Volgar-Gazprom		
2003	FC Spartak Trnava		
2003–2005	MŠK Rimavská Sobota		
2005–2006	DAC Dunajská Streda		

International career
1999–2000	Slovakia	4	(0)
- * Club domestic league appearances and goals

František Hadviger (born 13 July 1976) is a retired Slovak football midfielder.
