= Radim Holub =

Czech former football player (born 1975)

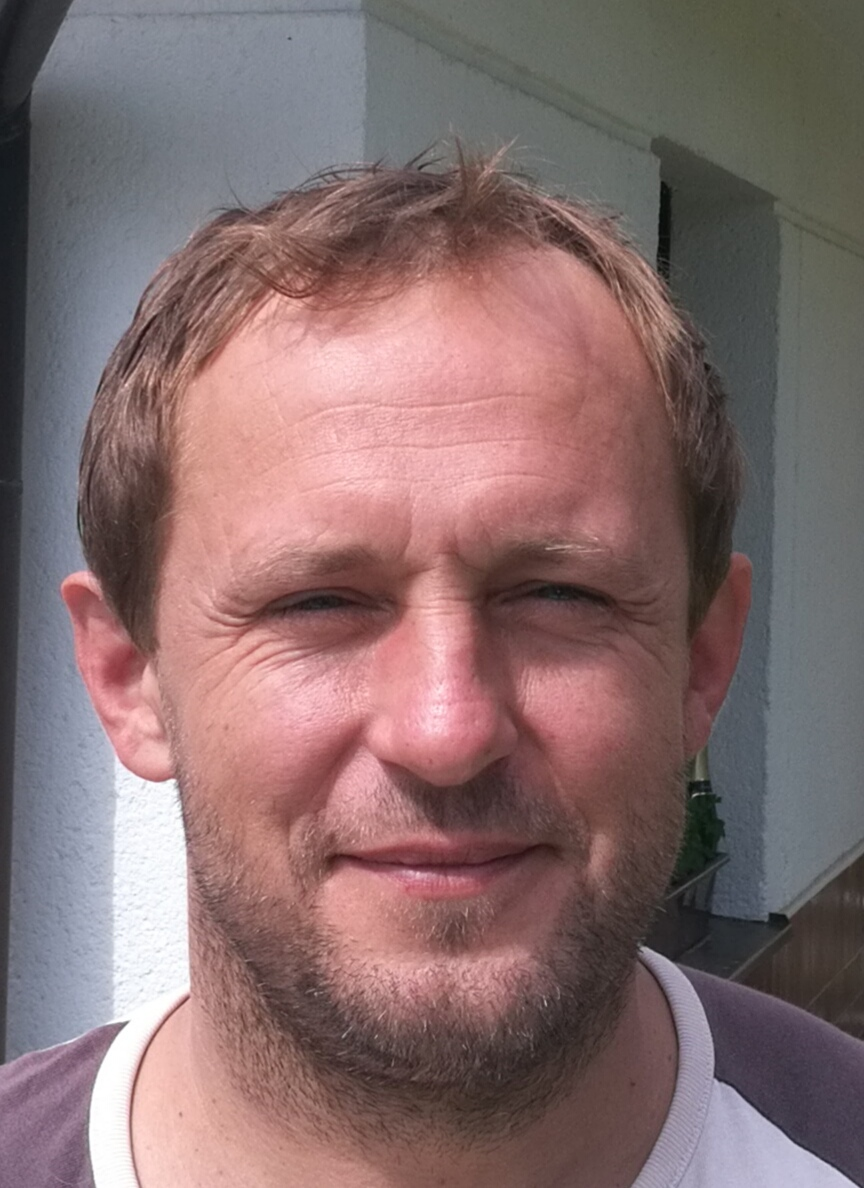
- Radim Holub in 2017

Personal information
- Date of birth: 12 November 1975 (age 50)
- Place of birth: Pardubice, Czechoslovakia
- Height: 1.76 m (5 ft 9 in)
- Position: Forward

Senior career*
Years	Team	Apps	(Gls)
1993–1996	Hradec Králové	57	(5)
1996–2000	Jablonec	127	(30)
2001–2003	Sparta Prague	43	(20)
2002–2004	→ Sparta Prague B (loan)	11	(3)
2003–2004	→ Kladno (loan)	26	(9)
2004–2005	Drnovice	29	(8)
2005–2008	Mladá Boleslav	56	(17)
2008–2009	Slovácko	10	(0)
2009–2010	Čáslav	7	(0)
Total		366	(92)

International career
1996–1997	Czech Republic U21	12	(5)
- * Club domestic league appearances and goals

Radim Holub (born 12 November 1975) is a Czech former football player. He played more than 300 games in the Czech First League for various clubs including Jablonec, Hradec Králové, Sparta Prague, Mladá Boleslav and Drnovice. He won the 2000–01 Czech First League with Sparta Prague.

Following his professional career, Holub moved to MFK Chrudim to play on an amateur basis.
