= Mirko Aleksić =

Serbian footballer

Personal information
- Full name: Mirko Aleksić
- Date of birth: 26 September 1977 (age 49)
- Place of birth: Novi Sad, SFR Yugoslavia
- Height: 1.75 m (5 ft 9 in)
- Position: Midfielder

Youth career
- Vojvodina

Senior career*
Years	Team	Apps	(Gls)
1994–1999	Vojvodina	70	(4)
1995–1996	→ Borac Čačak (loan)	26	(1)
2000–2006	Obilić	106	(6)
2005	→ Ethnikos Achna (loan)	10	(0)
2006	→ Smederevo (loan)	7	(0)
2006–2007	Smederevo	2	(0)
2007	→ Voždovac (loan)	8	(0)
2007–2008	Zemun	6	(0)
2008	→ Novi Pazar (loan)	6	(0)
2009	Proleter Novi Sad	12	(1)
Total		253	(12)
- * Club domestic league appearances and goals

Mirko Aleksić (Serbian Cyrillic: Мирко Алексић; born 26 September 1977) is a Serbian former professional footballer who played as a midfielder.

Aleksić spent the majority of his playing career with Vojvodina and Obilić, collecting over 150 appearances in the First League of Serbia and Montenegro. He also had a short spell abroad in Cyprus.
