= Nebojša Mladenović =

Serbian footballer

Personal information
- Date of birth: 19 October 1967 (age 59)
- Position: Forward

Senior career*
| Years | Team | Apps | (Gls) |
| 1996–1997 | APOP Paphos | 25 | (10) |
| 1997–1999 | Apollon Limassol | 32 | (2) |
| 1999-2000 | Anagennisi Deryneia | 22 | (5) |
| 2000–2001 | Doxa Katokopia | 24 | (8) |
| 2001–2002 | Ethnikos Ashia | 24 | (8) |
| 2002–2003 | Ethnikos Achna | 24 | (8) |
| 2004 | Anagennisi Deryneia | | |
- * Club domestic league appearances and goals

Nebojša Mladenović (born 19 October 1967) is a Serbian retired football striker.
