= Andreas Nyhaug =

Norwegian footballer (born 1973)

Personal information
- Date of birth: 24 March 1973 (age 53)
- Position: Defender

Youth career
- Råde

Senior career*
| Years | Team | Apps | (Gls) |
| –1992 | Råde | | |
| 1993–1996 | Moss | | |
| 1997 | Viking | 6 | (0) |
| 1998 | Skeid | 16 | (0) |
| 1999–2000 | Skarphedin | | |
| 2001–2003 | Tollnes | | |
| 2004 | Pors Grenland | | |
| 2005–2006 | Notodden | | |
| 2006–2007 | Pors Grenland | | |

International career
| 1990 | Norway u-17 | 1 | (0) |
| 1995 | Norway u-21 | 1 | (0) |
- * Club domestic league appearances and goals

Andreas Nyhaug (born 24 March 1973) is a retired Norwegian football defender.

He started his career in Råde IL and represented Norway as a youth international. He went from Moss FK to Viking FK in 1997, then Skeid Fotball in 1998 before moving to Telemark in 1999; first playing for IL Skarphedin.

Finishing in bronze position in the 1996 Eliteserien, Viking qualified for the 1997-98 UEFA Cup. Kindervåg played one of the UEFA Cup matches, the home leg against Vojvodina Novi Sad where Viking progressed after a penalty shootout. After the 1997 season, Stavanger Aftenblad reported that Nyhaug would leave Viking. He had offers from Odd and Skeid, but would study law in Oslo.

Outside of football, Nyhaug became a lawyer.
