= 1996–97 Danish Superliga =

7th season of Danish Superliga

Faxe Kondi Ligaen
- Season: 1996-97
- Champions: Brøndby IF
- Relegated: Viborg FF; Hvidovre IF

The 1996–97 Danish Superliga season was the 7th season of the Danish Superliga league championship, governed by the Danish Football Association. It took place from the first match on July 28, 1996, to final match on June 15, 1997.

The Danish champions qualified for the UEFA Champions League 1997-98 qualification, while the second and third placed teams qualified for the second qualification round of the UEFA Cup 1997-98. The fourth to sixth placed teams qualified for the UEFA Intertoto Cup 1997, while the two lowest placed teams of the tournament was directly relegated to the Danish 1st Division. Likewise, the Danish 1st Division champions and runners-up were promoted to the Superliga.

== Table ==
Pos	Team	Pld	W	D	L	GF	GA	GD	Pts	Qualification or relegation
1	Brøndby IF (C)	33	20	8	5	64	39	+25	68	Qualification to Champions League second qualifying round
2	Vejle BK	33	14	12	7	57	38	+19	54	Qualification to UEFA Cup second qualifying round
3	Aarhus GF	33	14	10	9	75	51	+24	52	Qualification to UEFA Cup second qualifying round
4	Herfølge BK	33	15	7	11	46	42	+4	52	
5	Aalborg BK	33	12	11	10	46	40	+6	47	Qualification to Intertoto Cup group stage
6	Silkeborg IF	33	10	15	8	51	55	−4	45	Qualification to Intertoto Cup group stage
7	Odense BK	33	11	8	14	59	61	−2	41	Qualification to Intertoto Cup group stage
8	FC København	33	10	11	12	35	43	−8	41	Qualification to Cup Winners' Cup first round
9	Lyngby FC	33	10	10	13	50	61	−11	40	
10	AB Copenhagen	33	8	12	13	56	62	−6	36	
11	Viborg FF (R)	33	6	11	16	31	58	−27	29	Relegation to Danish 1st Division
12	Hvidovre IF (R)	33	5	11	17	39	59	−20	26	Relegation to Danish 1st Division

Rules for classification: 1) points; 2) goal difference; 3) number of goals scored.
(C) Champions; (R) Relegated

== Results ==
Home \ Away	AB	AGF	BIF	FCK	HBK	HIF	LFC	OB	SIF	VB	VFF	AAB	AB	AGF	BIF	FCK	HBK	HIF	LFC	OB	SIF	VB	VFF	AAB
AB		1–1	1–1	0–1	2–2	7–1	2–2	2–2	2–3	0–3	3–1	1–3		1–1	2–2						4–3	2–3		3–1
AGF	2–1		2–3	3–1	3–0	3–2	3–4	2–2	6–1	3–2	5–0	6–1				2–1	2–2		4–2		2–2	2–1		0–1
Brøndby IF	3–2	2–0		2–0	2–0	1–1	2–0	1–2	2–1	1–2	4–0	2–0		2–1			1–3	3–1			2–2	2–0		2–2
FC Copenhagen	1–1	1–1	2–3		0–1	1–0	1–1	1–0	3–0	0–0	1–1	1–1	2–0		1–2		1–1					1–1	2–1	
Herfølge BK	2–1	0–1	1–2	4–0		1–0	2–0	0–1	1–1	3–0	0–1	4–2	4–1					4–3	0–3	1–1			1–0	
Hvidovre IF	0–0	3–2	2–3	1–2	0–1		2–2	4–3	0–1	0–1	1–0	1–2	1–1	2–2		0–2							0–0	1–1
Lyngby FC	6–1	3–1	1–4	0–2	1–1	1–0		2–1	1–4	1–1	0–3	0–2	3–2		2–0	2–0		2–1		1–4			1–1	
OB	1–3	1–0	1–2	3–3	2–3	2–1	4–3		6–0	0–2	3–1	1–1	1–2	1–1	0–3	4–1		0–2					2–1	
Silkeborg IF	3–3	4–3	2–2	1–1	0–2	1–1	1–1	2–2		2–0	0–0	1–1				1–1	1–0	3–0	3–1	2–1		1–1		
Vejle BK	1–0	1–1	3–0	3–0	0–0	2–2	2–2	4–0	2–1		1–1	2–0					4–1	3–3	4–1	4–1			2–2	
Viborg FF	1–1	2–5	0–1	1–0	2–0	1–1	1–1	3–5	3–1	1–1		0–5	0–1	0–4	1–1						0–2			1–0
AaB	1–3	1–1	1–1	2–0	4–0	1–2	2–0	2–1	1–1	2–1	3–1					0–1	0–1		0–0	1–1	0–0	2–0		

Source: Danskfodbold.com

== Top goal scorers ==
Rank	Player	Club	Goals
1	(Denmark) Miklos Molnar	Lyngby FC	26
2	(Denmark) Peter Møller	Brøndby IF	22
3	(Denmark) Thomas Thorninger	Aarhus GF	19
4	(Denmark) Morten Bisgaard	Odense BK	16
5	(Denmark) Søren Andersen	Aalborg BK	14
5	(Denmark) Peter Lassen	AB Cph.	14
7	(Denmark) Peter Knudsen	AB Cph.	13
8	(Denmark) Stig Tøfting	Aarhus GF	12
8	(Norway) Håvard Flo	Aarhus GF	12
10	(Denmark) Chris Hermansen	Herfølge BK	11
10	(Denmark) Per Pedersen	Odense BK	11

== Attendances ==
No.	Club	Average	Highest
1	Brøndby IF	12,058	17,712
2	AGF	9,689	18,472
3	FC København	8,721	28,491
4	AaB	7,999	12,095
5	Vejle BK	4,683	12,786
6	OB	3,906	7,513
7	Silkeborg IF	3,735	8,791
8	Hvidovre IF	3,057	8,052
9	Viborg FF	2,748	6,273
10	Lyngby BK	2,578	8,359
11	AB	2,111	6,119
12	Herfølge BK	2,026	8,172

== See also ==
- 1996-97 in Danish football
