= Tom Enberg =

Finnish footballer (born 1970)

Personal information
- Date of birth: 26 August 1970 (age 56)
- Place of birth: Hanko
- Positions: Midfielder; forward; winger

Senior career*
Years	Team	Apps	(Gls)
1988–1992	Hangö IK		
1993–1995	TPS	71	(19)
1996–1997	MyPa	44	(10)
1998–1999	TPS	39	(3)
1999–2001	Hangö IK	50	(22)
2004–	Hangö IK		

International career
1995–1996	Finland	5	(0)
- * Club domestic league appearances and goals

Tom Enberg (born 26 August 1970) is a Finnish football midfielder and forward. He played 5 international friendlies for Finland. He was still active as of 2021 playing for his hometown club Hangö IK. During 1990s he played in Finland's top tier Veikkausliiga for Turun Palloseura and Myllykosken Pallo -47.
