= Pavlice, Trnava District =

Pavlice
- Municipality
- Flag

- Location of Pavlice in the Trnava Region Location of Pavlice in Slovakia
- Coordinates: 48°15′30″N 17°34′40″E
- Country: Slovakia
- Region: Trnava Region
- District: Trnava District
- First mentioned: 1266

Area
  - Total: 7.62 km^{2} (2.94 sq mi)
- Elevation: 127 m (417 ft)

Population (2025)
  - Total: 525
- Time zone: UTC+1 (CET)
  - Summer (DST): UTC+2 (CEST)
- Postal code: 919 42
- Area code: +421 33
- Vehicle registration plate (until 2022): TT
- Website: www.pavlice.sk

Pavlice (Hungarian: Páld) is a village and municipality of Trnava District in the Trnava region of Slovakia.

== Population ==
Population statistic (10 years)
Year	1995	2005	2015	2025
Count	509	496	551	525
Difference		−2.55%	+11.08%	−4.71%

Population statistic
Year	2024	2025
Count	535	525
Difference		−1.86%

It has a population of 525 people (31 December 2025).

=== Ethnicity ===
Census 2021 (1+ %)
Ethnicity	Number	Fraction
Slovak	528	97.05%
Not found out	9	1.65%
Total	544	

In year 2021 was 544 people by ethnicity 528 as Slovak, 9 as Not found out, 5 as Czech, 4 as Other, 3 as Ukrainian, 2 as Russian, 2 as Hungarian, 1 as Rusyn, 1 as Romanian, 1 as Austrian and 1 as German.

Note on population: The difference values of population numbers in the table "Population statistic" and in the sections "Ethnicity" & "Religion" is caused by the use of various statistical methods.

=== Religion ===
Census 2021 (1+ %)
Religion	Number	Fraction
Roman Catholic Church	430	79.04%
None	96	17.65%
Not found out	7	1.29%
Greek Catholic Church	6	1.1%
Total	544	

In year 2021 was 544 people by religion 430 from Roman Catholic Church, 96 from None, 7 from Not found out, 6 from Greek Catholic Church, 3 from Evangelical Church, 1 from Eastern Orthodox Church and 1 from Other.
