= Carsten Hallum =

Danish footballer (born 1969)

Personal information
- Date of birth: 9 September 1969
- Place of birth: Denmark
- Position(s): Forward

Senior career*
Years	Team	Apps	(Gls)
199x-1996	Hvidovre IF		
1996	F.C. Copenhagen	13	(2)
1996-1997	Hvidovre IF	26	(5)
1997	Raith Rovers F.C.	6	(0)
1997-2001	Aarhus Gymnastikforening	64	(4)
2001	FC Nordsjælland		
2004	Hvidovre IF		
- *Club domestic league appearances and goals

Carsten Hallum (born 9 September 1969 in Denmark) is a Danish retired footballer who now works as a mechanical worker and chief designer at an animal testing company in his home country.

== Career ==
Callum started his senior career with Hvidovre IF. In 1997, he signed for Raith Rovers in the Scottish Premier League, where he made six appearances and scored zero goals. After that, he played for Danish clubs Aarhus Gymnastikforening, Nordsjælland, and Hvidovre IF before retiring in 2004.
