= 2001–02 FC Tirol Innsbruck season =

FC Tirol Innsbruck
2001–02 season
- Manager: Kurt Jara (until 4 October); Joachim Löw (from 10 October)
- Stadium: Tivoli Stadion Tirol
- Austrian Football Bundesliga: 1st
- Austrian Cup: Third round
- Champions League: Third qualifying round
- UEFA Cup: Second round
- Top goalscorer: League: Radosław Gilewicz (11); All: Radosław Gilewicz (13)

During the 2001–02 season, FC Tirol Innsbruck played in the Austrian Football Bundesliga, the highest tier of the Austrian football league system.

== Season summary ==
Tirol Innsbruck won their third successive league title. However, the club's financial obligations, including an annual wage bill of €10 million, ultimately saw the collapse of the club at the end of the season. The club were unable to post a €4.5 million bond with the league, resulting in the loss of their license to play in the Bundesliga. With debts totaling €16 million, the club went bankrupt. A successor club, FC Wacker Tirol, was formed, and merged with third-tier club Wattens to avoid starting in the bottom tier.

== Players ==
=== First team squad ===
Squad at end of season

No.	Pos.	Nation	Player
1	GK	RUS	Stanislav Cherchesov
3	DF	AUT	Walter Kogler
4	DF	AUT	Robert Wazinger
5	DF	SUI	Marco Zwyssig
6	MF	AUT	Roland Kirchler
8	MF	AUT	Michael Baur
9	MF	POL	Radosław Gilewicz
10	MF	POL	Jerzy Brzęczek
11	MF	AUT	Alfred Hörtnagl
12	MF	AUT	Thomas Grumser
14	DF	AUT	Oliver Prudlo
15	DF	AUT	Robert Ibertsberger
17	MF	AUT	Stephan Marasek
18	FW	AUT	Wolfgang Mair
19	FW	AUT	Edi Glieder

No.	Pos.	Nation	Player
20	MF	AUT	Zoran Barisic
21	MF	AUT	Markus Scharrer
23	GK	AUT	Heinz Weber
24	MF	AUT	Andreas Schiener
25	GK	GER	Marc Ziegler
26	MF	AUT	Mario Sara
27	FW	SEN	Ibrahima Sidibe
28	MF	CZE	Patrik Ježek
30	MF	AUT	Jürgen Panis
—	GK	ITA	Reinhold Harrasser
—	DF	AUT	Stefan Köck
—	DF	SWE	Olof Persson
—	MF	GER	Markus Anfang
—	FW	BFA	Wilfried Sanou (on loan from Wattens)

== Competitions ==
=== Bundesliga ===
==== League table ====
Pos	Team	Pld	W	D	L	GF	GA	GD	Pts	Qualification or relegation
1	Tirol Innsbruck (C, R)	36	23	6	7	63	20	+43	75	Relegation to Austrian West League (Note: Tirol Innsbruck did not receive a licence for the next season and were excluded from Austrian Bundesliga. Subsequently, they were excluded from the Champions League, while Bundesliga runners-up Sturm Graz were moved from Second to Third qualifying round and 3rd-placed team Grazer AK replaced Sturm in the Second qualifying round.)
2	Sturm Graz	36	18	11	7	68	42	+26	65	Qualification to Champions League third qualifying round
3	Grazer AK	36	17	12	7	69	39	+30	63	Qualification to Champions League second qualifying round
4	Austria Wien	36	14	11	11	53	38	+15	53	Qualification to UEFA Cup first round
5	Kärnten	36	14	8	14	40	52	−12	50	Qualification to UEFA Cup qualifying round

Source: weltfussball.de (in German)
Rules for classification: 1) points; 2) goal difference; 3) number of goals scored.
(C) Champions; (R) Relegated

=== UEFA Champions League ===
==== Qualifying rounds ====
===== Third qualifying round =====
7 August 2001 First leg	Lokomotiv Moscow (Russia)	3–1	(Austria) Tirol Innsbruck	Ramenskoye, Russia
18:00 CET	Lekgetho 2'; Izmailov 37'; Ignashevich 79'	Report	Kirchler 19'	Stadium: Saturn Stadium; Attendance: 12,500; Referee: Kim Milton Nielsen (Denmark)
Note: Lokomotiv Moscow played their home match at Saturn Stadium in Ramenskoye, as their regular home venue Lokomotiv Stadium in Moscow was closed for renovation.

22 August 2001 Second leg	Tirol Innsbruck (Austria)	0–1; Annulled	(Russia) Lokomotiv Moscow	Innsbruck, Austria
17:00 CET		Report	Maminov 51'	Stadium: Tivoli; Attendance: 18,000; Referee: Mario van der Ende (Netherlands)
Note: The second leg was annulled and replayed after UEFA admitted a referee mistake as Lokomotiv player was not expelled after receiving two yellow cards.

8 September 2001 Second leg replay	Tirol Innsbruck (Austria)	1–0 (2–3 agg.)	(Russia) Lokomotiv Moscow	Innsbruck, Austria
17:00 CET	Brzęczek 30'	Report		Stadium: Tivoli; Attendance: 15,500; Referee: Vítor Melo Pereira (Portugal)

=== UEFA Cup ===
==== First round ====
11 September 2001 First leg	Viktoria Žižkov (Czech Republic)	0–0	(Austria) Tirol Innsbruck	Prague, Czech Republic
17:30 CET		Report		Stadium: FK Viktoria Stadion; Attendance: 1,326; Referee: Laurent Duhamel (France)

25 September 2001 Second leg	Tirol Innsbruck (Austria)	1–0 (1–0 agg.)	(Czech Republic) Viktoria Žižkov	Innsbruck, Austria
18:00 CET	Glieder 49'	Report		Stadium: Tivoli; Attendance: 7,000; Referee: Vasyl Melnychuk (Ukraine)

==== Second round ====
18 October 2001 First leg	Fiorentina (Italy)	2–0	(Austria) Tirol Innsbruck	Florence, Italy
20:45 CET	Morfeo 47'; Nuno Gomes 86'	Report		Stadium: Stadio Artemio Franchi; Attendance: 10,418; Referee: Martin Ingvarsson (Sweden)

1 November 2001 Second leg	Tirol Innsbruck (Austria)	2–2 (2–4 agg.)	(Italy) Fiorentina	Innsbruck, Austria
20:30 CET	Gilewicz 25', 75'	Report	Nuno Gomes 26'; Morfeo 41'	Stadium: Tivoli; Attendance: 14,500; Referee: Georgios Douros (Greece)
