= Eduard Glieder =

Austrian footballer

Edi Glieder
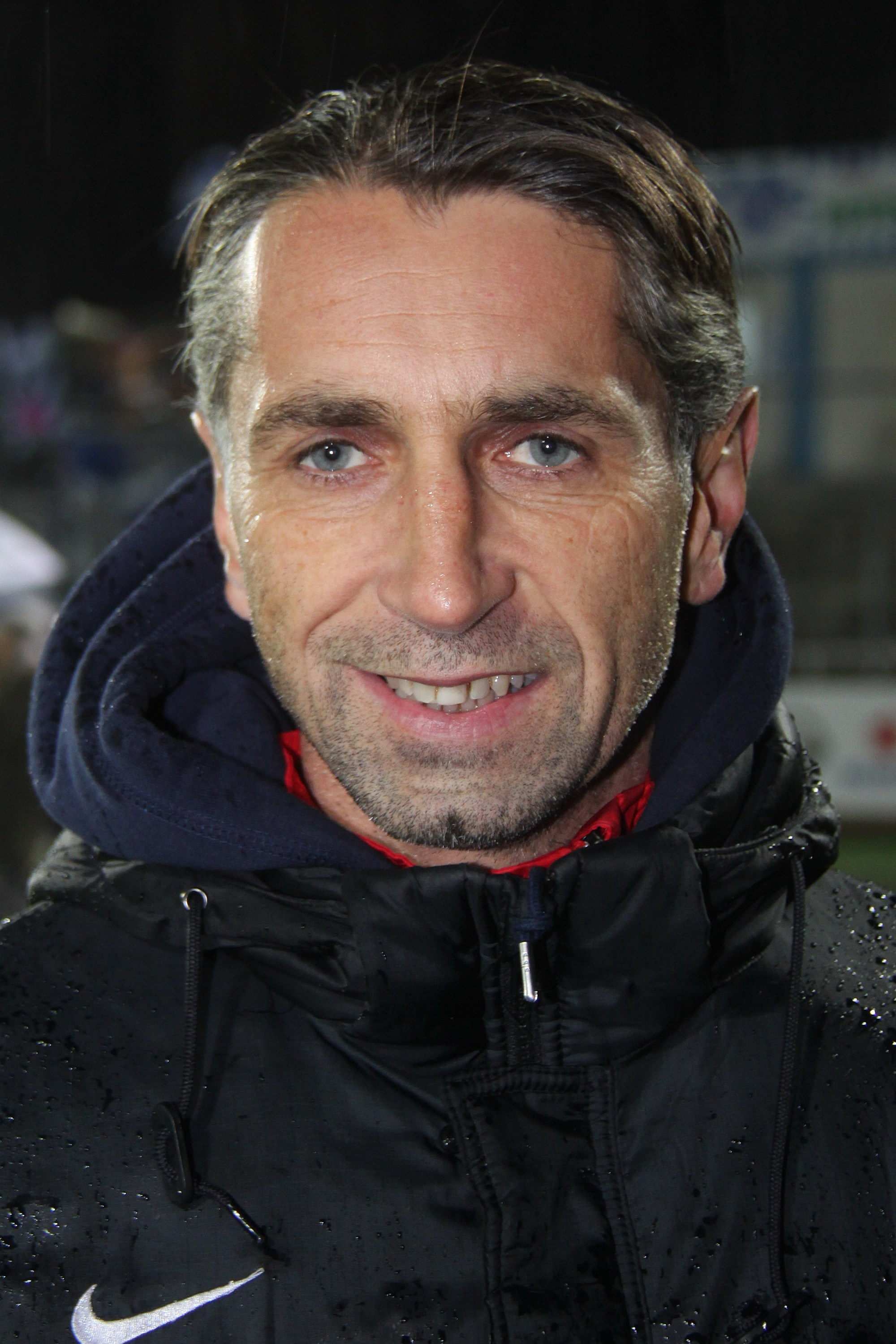
- Glieder in 2013

Personal information
- Full name: Eduard Glieder
- Date of birth: 28 January 1969 (age 57)
- Place of birth: Graz, Austria
- Height: 1.80 m (5 ft 11 in)
- Position: Forward

Youth career
- 1978–1987: St. Margarethen
- 1987–1989: Grazer AK

Senior career*
Years	Team	Apps	(Gls)
1989–1996	Grazer AK	189	(41)
1994–1995	→ Austria Salzburg (loan)	20	(3)
1996–1999	Austria Salzburg	110	(47)
1999–2002	Tirol Innsbruck	55	(12)
2002–2006	SV Pasching	86	(35)
2003–2004	→ FC Schalke 04 (loan)	16	(2)
2006	FC Kärnten	15	(3)
2006–2007	SV Grödig	11	(1)
2007–2009	FC Pasching	65	(63)
2013	SV Rosegg	4	(0)

International career
1998–2004	Austria	11	(4)

Managerial career
- 2006–2007: SV Grödig
- 2010: FC Pasching II
- 2010–2012: SK Vorwärts Steyr
- 2015–2016: SV Wals-Grünau
- * Club domestic league appearances and goals

Eduard “Edi” Glieder (born 28 January 1969) is an Austrian former professional footballer played as a forward.

== Career statistics ==
=== Club ===
Appearances and goals by club, season and competition
Club	Season	League			Cup		Europe		Other		Total	
Club	Season	Division	Apps	Goals	Apps	Goals	Apps	Goals	Apps	Goals	Apps	Goals
Grazer AK	1988–89	Austrian Bundesliga	3	0	0	0	—		—		3	0
Grazer AK	1989–90	Austrian Bundesliga	33	1	3	1	—		—		36	2
Grazer AK	1990–91	Austrian Second League	35	6	3	0	—		—		38	6
Grazer AK	1991–92	Austrian Second League	34	3	5	1	—		—		39	4
Grazer AK	1992–93	Austrian Second League	21	4	1	0	—		—		22	4
Grazer AK	1993–94	Austrian Second League	27	20	5	2	—		—		32	22
Grazer AK	1995–96	Austrian Bundesliga	36	7	4	1	—		—		40	8
Grazer AK	Total		189	41	21	5	—		—		210	46
Austria Salzburg	1994–95 (loan)	Austrian Bundesliga	20	3	3	1	—		—		23	4
Austria Salzburg	1996–97	Austrian Bundesliga	28	12	3	2	—		—		31	14
Austria Salzburg	1997–98	Austrian Bundesliga	32	9	3	1	4	3	1 (Note: Appearances in Austrian Supercup)	0	40	13
Austria Salzburg	1998–99	Austrian Bundesliga	34	22	4	3	—		7 (Note: Appearances in UEFA Intertoto Cup)	5	45	30
Austria Salzburg	1999–2000	Austrian Bundesliga	16	4	1	1	—		—		17	5
Austria Salzburg	Total		130	50	14	8	4	3	8	5	156	66
Tirol Innsbruck	1999–2000	Austrian Bundesliga	12	0	3	2	—		—		15	2
Tirol Innsbruck	2000–01	Austrian Bundesliga	21	5	5	4	4	0	1	0	31	9
Tirol Innsbruck	2001–02	Austrian Bundesliga	22	7	1	0	4	1	—		27	8
Tirol Innsbruck	Total		55	12	9	6	8	1	1	0	73	19
SV Pasching	2002–03	Austrian Bundesliga	33	17	0	0	—		—		33	17
SV Pasching	2003–04	Austrian Bundesliga	6	8	0	0	—		9	6	15	14
SV Pasching	2004–05	Austrian Bundesliga	33	9	1	0	2	2	—		36	11
SV Pasching	2005–06	Austrian Bundesliga	14	1	0	0	2	0	—		16	1
SV Pasching	Total		86	35	1	0	4	2	9	6	100	43
Schalke 04	2003–04 (loan)	German Bundesliga	16	2	1	0	—		—		17	2
FC Kärnten	2005–06	Austrian Second League	15	3	0	0	—		—		15	3
SV Grödig	2006–07	Austrian Regionalliga	11	1	—		—		—		11	1
FC Pasching	2007–08	Austrian 2. Landesliga	26	29	—		—		—		26	29
FC Pasching	2008–09	Austrian Landesliga	25	25	1	1	—		—		26	26
FC Pasching	2009–10	Austrian Regionalliga	14	9	2	0	—		—		16	9
FC Pasching	Total		65	63	3	1	—		—		68	64
Career total			567	207	49	20	16	6	18	11	650	244

=== International ===
Appearances and goals by national team and year
National team	Year	Apps	Goals
Austria	1998	2	1
Austria	1999	3	1
Austria	2000	0	0
Austria	2001	1	1
Austria	2002	0	0
Austria	2003	3	1
Austria	2004	2	0
Total		11	4

== Honours ==
Austria Salzburg

- Austrian Bundesliga winner: 1994–95, 1996–97
- Austrian Supercup winner: 1997
- Austrian Bundesliga top scorer: 1998–99 (22 goals)

Tirol Innsbruck

- Austrian Bundesliga winner: 1999–2000, 2000–01, 2001–02

== Background ==
His youth club St. Margarethen renamed its stadium to "Edi-Glieder Stadion" in June 2001.
