= Michael Baur (footballer) =

Austrian footballer (born 1969)

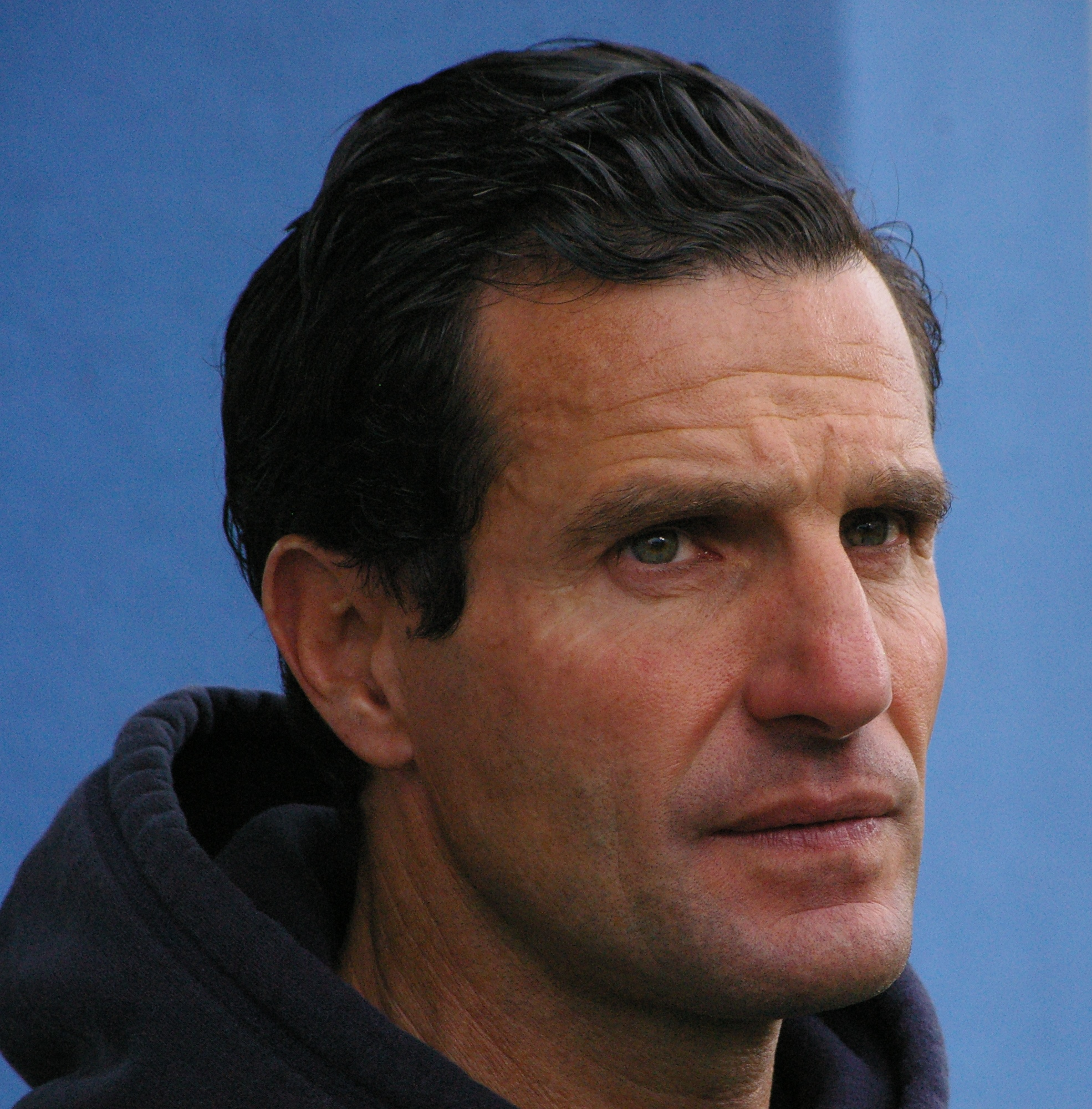
- Baur in 2015

Personal information
- Date of birth: 16 April 1969 (age 57)
- Place of birth: Innsbruck, Austria
- Height: 1.81 m (5 ft 11 in)
- Position: Defensive midfielder

Youth career
- SV Innsbruck

Senior career*
Years	Team	Apps	(Gls)
1989–1996	Tirol Innsbruck	233	(18)
1997	Urawa Reds	2	(0)
1997–2002	Tirol Innsbruck	139	(23)
2002–2003	Hamburger SV	10	(0)
2003–2007	SV Pasching	128	(11)
2007–2009	LASK Linz	66	(5)
Total		578	(57)

International career
1990–2002	Austria	40	(5)

Managerial career
- 2012–2014: Red Bull Salzburg (youth team)
- 2014–2015: SV Grödig
- * Club domestic league appearances and goals

Michael Baur (born 16 April 1969) is an Austrian former professional footballer who played as a defensive midfielder.

== Club career ==
Born in Innsbruck, Baur started his career with Tirol Innsbruck and played 12 seasons for them, winning four league titles and a domestic cup. In 1997, he went for a short break to Japan and also played a season in the German Bundesliga for Hamburger SV. At 34 years of age, he signed for SV Pasching, and after another four seasons there he decided to make another move and switched to LASK Linz.

== International career ==
Baur made his debut for the Austria national team in a May 1990 friendly match against the Netherlands as a substitute for Kurt Russ and was a non-playing squad member at the 1990 FIFA World Cup. His last international match was an October 2002 European Championship qualifying match, also against the Netherlands. He earned a total of 40 caps, scoring five goals.

== Coaching career ==
Baur was announced as the new head coach of SV Grödig on 7 May 2014, four days before the final match of the end of the 2013–14 season. He begins in the 2014–15 season. He had been the head coach of the reserve team of Red Bull Salzburg from the summer of 2012 to end of November 2013. He was sacked on 4 June 2015.

== Career statistics ==
=== Club ===
Appearances and goals by club, season and competition
Club	Season	League		
Club	Season	Division	Apps	Goals
Tirol Innsbruck (Note: "Swarovski Tirol" until 1993)	1989–90	Austrian Bundesliga	22	2
Tirol Innsbruck	1990–91	Austrian Bundesliga	36	1
Tirol Innsbruck	1991–92	Austrian Bundesliga	33	3
Tirol Innsbruck	1992–93	Austrian Bundesliga	33	3
Tirol Innsbruck	1993–94	Austrian Bundesliga	34	6
Tirol Innsbruck	1994–95	Austrian Bundesliga	30	1
Tirol Innsbruck	1995–96	Austrian Bundesliga	33	1
Tirol Innsbruck	1996–97	Austrian Bundesliga	12	1
Tirol Innsbruck	Total		233	18
Urawa Reds	1997	J1 League	2	0
Tirol Innsbruck	1997–98	Austrian Bundesliga	28	3
Tirol Innsbruck	1998–99	Austrian Bundesliga	27	4
Tirol Innsbruck	1999–2000	Austrian Bundesliga	19	4
Tirol Innsbruck	2000–01	Austrian Bundesliga	34	6
Tirol Innsbruck	2001–02	Austrian Bundesliga	31	6
Tirol Innsbruck	Total		139	23
Hamburger SV	2002–03	Bundesliga	10	0
Pasching	2003–04	Austrian Bundesliga	31	3
Pasching	2004–05	Austrian Bundesliga	29	1
Pasching	2005–06	Austrian Bundesliga	34	4
Pasching	2006–07	Austrian Bundesliga	34	3
Pasching	Total		128	11
LASK	2007–08	Austrian Bundesliga	35	2
LASK	2008–09	Austrian Bundesliga	31	3
LASK	Total		66	5
Career total			578	57

=== International ===
Appearances and goals by national team and year
National team	Year	Apps	Goals
Austria	1990	2	0
Austria	1991	7	0
Austria	1992	7	1
Austria	1993	6	1
Austria	1994	1	0
Austria	1995	0	0
Austria	1996	0	0
Austria	1997	0	0
Austria	1998	0	0
Austria	1999	0	0
Austria	2000	2	1
Austria	2001	8	2
Austria	2002	7	0
Total		40	5

=== Coaching record ===
As of 4 June 2015

Team	From	To	Record								
Team	From	To	G	W	D	L	GF	GA	GD	Win %	Ref.
Red Bull Salzburg II	June 2012	November 2013	46	17	13	16	74	71	+3	36.96	
Grödig	1 June 2014	4 June 2015	45	16	7	22	65	73	−8	35.56	
Total			91	33	20	38	139	144	−5	36.26	—

== Honours ==
Tirol Innsbruck

- Austrian Bundesliga: 1989–90, 1999–2000, 2000–01, 2001–02
- Austrian Cup: 1992–93
