= Marc Ziegler =

German footballer

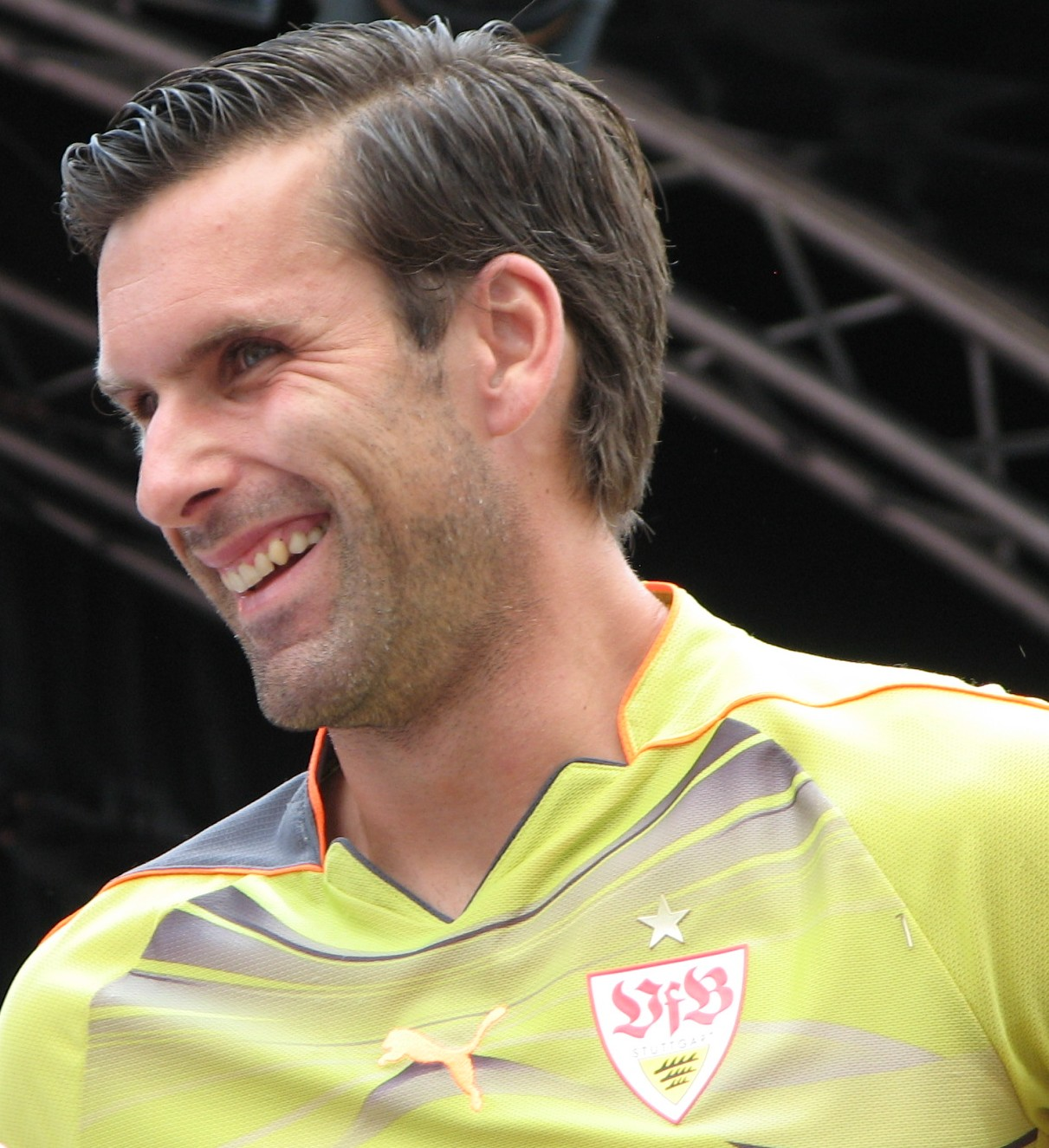
- Ziegler in training with VfB Stuttgart

Personal information
- Date of birth: 13 June 1976 (age 50)
- Place of birth: Blieskastel, West Germany
- Height: 1.92 m (6 ft 4 in)
- Position: Goalkeeper

Youth career
- SV Webenheim
- 1. FC Saarbrücken
- 1993–1994: VfB Stuttgart

Senior career*
Years	Team	Apps	(Gls)
1994–1999	VfB Stuttgart	41	(0)
1999–2000	Arminia Bielefeld	5	(0)
2000–2001	Bursaspor	6	(0)
2001–2002	Tirol Innsbruck	20	(0)
2002–2003	Austria Vienna	6	(0)
2003–2004	Hannover 96	30	(0)
2004–2005	Austria Vienna	0	(0)
2005–2006	1. FC Saarbrücken	11	(0)
2006–2007	Arminia Bielefeld	4	(0)
2007–2010	Borussia Dortmund	23	(0)
2010–2013	VfB Stuttgart	0	(0)
Total		146	(0)

International career
1996	Germany U21	1	(0)
- * Club domestic league appearances and goals

Marc Ziegler (born 13 June 1976) is a German former professional footballer who played as a goalkeeper.

He appeared in 103 Bundesliga games over the course of 14 seasons, mainly at the service of VfB Stuttgart (eight years). He also competed professionally in Turkey and Austria.

== Career ==
Ziegler was born in Blieskastel.

VfB Stuttgart was immersed in a goalkeeping crisis after the defection of legendary Eike Immel to England's Manchester City in the 1995 summer. Youth graduate Ziegler – then 19 – won the battle for first choice over longtime backup Eberhard Trautner and played all the season's matches save five, but the club finished tenth with the second-worst defensive record in the Bundesliga, only winning to Eintracht Frankfurt.

In the following three years Ziegler only appeared in 12 more games combined, eventually leaving club and country in 2000 after a brief spell at Arminia Bielefeld: he started in Turkey with Bursaspor, then left in January 2001 to Austria, where he was the starter for FC Tirol Innsbruck in back-to-back national championship conquests. In his second year he also stayed unbeaten for more than 1,000 minutes, coming close to an all-time European best.

Ziegler moved teams but stayed in the country in the 2002 summer, signing with FK Austria Wien, where he played rarely in two years, which were interspersed with a return to his country, at Hannover 96. In the next two seasons, back in Germany, he played with former youth side 1. FC Saarbrücken (second division) and Arminia again.

Ziegler signed with Borussia Dortmund for the 2007–08 campaign, and split first-choice duties with Roman Weidenfeller in that first year. On 29 January 2008, he saved a penalty kick from SV Werder Bremen's Diego – who had already beaten him from the same spot – in the German Cup 2–1 home win; in the subsequent seasons, however, he was second choice.

On 13 May 2010, 34-year-old Ziegler signed a three-year contract with former side Stuttgart, effective as of 1 July 2010. His input in his second spell consisted of two appearances in the 2010–11 UEFA Europa League, and he was released at the end of 2012–13.

== Career statistics ==
Appearances and goals by club, season and competition
Club	Season	League			Cup		Europe		Other		Total	
Club	Season	Division	Apps	Goals	Apps	Goals	Apps	Goals	Apps	Goals	Apps	Goals
VfB Stuttgart	1993–94	Bundesliga	0	0	—		—		—		0	0
VfB Stuttgart	1994–95	Bundesliga	0	0	0	0	—		—		0	0
VfB Stuttgart	1995–96	Bundesliga	29	0	1	0	—		—		30	0
VfB Stuttgart	1996–97	Bundesliga	1	0	0	0	1	0	—		2	0
VfB Stuttgart	1997–98	Bundesliga	2	0	0	0	2	0	0	0	4	0
VfB Stuttgart	1998–99	Bundesliga	9	0	2	0	3	0	1	0	15	0
VfB Stuttgart	Total		41	0	3	0	6	0	1	0	51	0
Arminia Bielefeld	1999–2000	Bundesliga	5	0	0	0	—		—		5	0
Bursaspor	2000–01	1.Lig	6	0	—		—		—		6	0
Tirol Innsbruck	2000–01	Austrian Bundesliga	14	0	5	0	—		—		19	0
Tirol Innsbruck	2001–02	Austrian Bundesliga	20	0	—		6	0	1	0	27	0
Tirol Innsbruck	Total		34	0	5	0	6	0	1	0	46	0
Austria Vienna	2001–02	Austrian Bundesliga	5	0	1	0	—		—		6	0
Austria Vienna	2002–03	Austrian Bundesliga	1	0	0	0	0	0	—		1	0
Austria Vienna	Total		6	0	1	0	0	0	—		7	0
Hannover 96	2003–04	Bundesliga	30	0	1	0	—		—		31	0
Austria Vienna	2004–05	Austrian Bundesliga	0	0	0	0	0	0	0	0	0	0
1. FC Saarbrücken	2005–06	2. Bundesliga	11	0	1	0	—		—		12	0
Arminia Bielefeld	2006–07	Bundesliga	4	0	0	0	—		—		4	0
Borussia Dortmund	2007–08	Bundesliga	15	0	6	0	—		—		21	0
Borussia Dortmund	2008–09	Bundesliga	3	0	0	0	0	0	—		3	0
Borussia Dortmund	2009–10	Bundesliga	5	0	0	0	—		—		5	0
Borussia Dortmund	Total		23	0	6	0	0	0	—		29	0
VfB Stuttgart	2010–11	Bundesliga	0	0	0	0	2	0	—		2	0
VfB Stuttgart	2011–12	Bundesliga	0	0	0	0	—		—		0	0
VfB Stuttgart	2012–13	Bundesliga	0	0	0	0	0	0	—		0	0
VfB Stuttgart	Total		0	0	0	0	2	0	—		2	0
Career total			160	0	17	0	14	0	2	0	193	0

== Honours ==
FC Tirol Innsbruck

- Austrian Bundesliga: 2000–01, 2001–02

1. FC Kaiserslautern

- DFB-Pokal: 1996–97

VfB Stuttgart

- UEFA Cup Winners' Cup: runner-up 1997–98
- DFB-Ligapokal: runner-up 1997, 1998

Borussia Dortmund

- DFB-Pokal: runner-up 2007–08
