= Stanislav Cherchesov =

Russian football manager (born 1963)

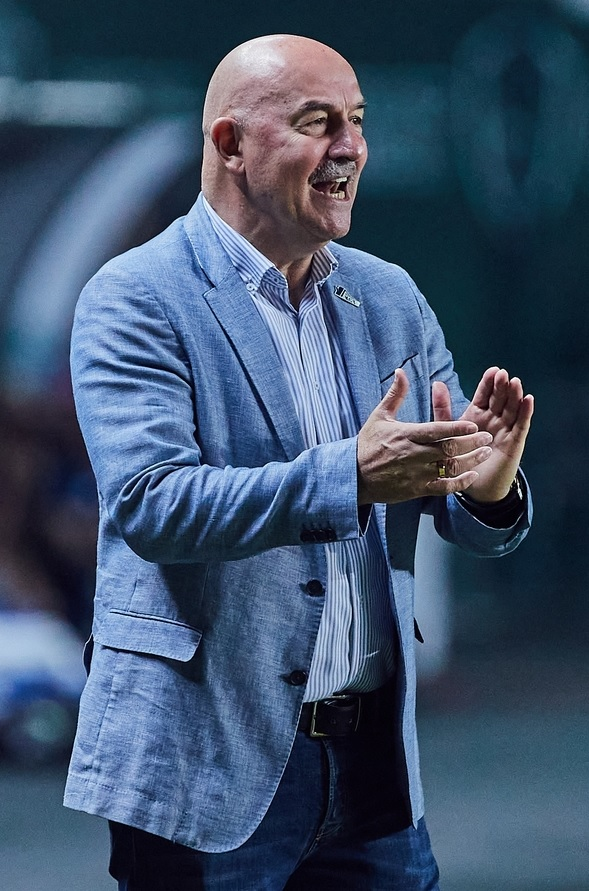
- Cherchesov as Akhmat Grozny manager in 2025

Personal information
- Full name: Stanislav Salamovich Cherchesov
- Date of birth: 2 September 1963 (age 63)
- Place of birth: Alagir, North Ossetian ASSR, Russian SFSR, Soviet Union
- Height: 1.83 m (6 ft 0 in)
- Position: Goalkeeper

Senior career*
Years	Team	Apps	(Gls)
1982–1984	Spartak Ordzhonikidze	15	(0)
1984–1987	Spartak Moscow	13	(0)
1988	Lokomotiv Moscow	30	(0)
1988–1993	Spartak Moscow	121	(0)
1993–1995	Dynamo Dresden	57	(0)
1995	→ Spartak Moscow (loan)	8	(0)
1996–2002	Tirol Innsbruck	182	(0)
2002	Spartak Moscow	7	(0)
Total		433	(0)

International career
1990–1991	Soviet Union	8	(0)
1992	CIS	2	(0)
1992–2000	Russia	39	(0)

Managerial career
- 2004: Kufstein
- 2004–2006: Wacker Tirol
- 2007–2008: Spartak Moscow
- 2010–2011: Zhemchuzhina Sochi
- 2011–2013: Terek Grozny
- 2013–2014: Amkar Perm
- 2014–2015: Dynamo Moscow
- 2015–2016: Legia Warsaw
- 2016–2021: Russia
- 2021–2023: Ferencváros
- 2024–2025: Kazakhstan
- 2025–2026: Akhmat Grozny
- * Club domestic league appearances and goals

Stanislav Salamovich Cherchesov (Russian: Станислав Саламович Черчесов, pronounced [stənʲɪˈslaf sɐˈlaməvʲɪtɕ tɕɪrˈtɕesəf]; Iron Ossetic: Черчесты Саламы фырт Станислав, romanized: Čerčesty Salamy fyrt Stanislav; born 2 September 1963) is a Russian professional football manager and former goalkeeper.

In August 2016, he was appointed as head coach of the Russia national team and led them to the quarter-finals of the 2018 FIFA World Cup. He was dismissed after the team was eliminated in the UEFA Euro 2020 group stage. He took charge of Hungarian side Ferencváros in 2021, winning two consecutive Nemzeti Bajnokság I titles before being sacked in July 2023. From June 2024 to January 2025, he was also the head coach of the Kazakhstan national team.

== Club career ==
The goalkeeper played 57 matches in the German top-flight for former East German powerhouse Dynamo Dresden a couple of years after reunification between East and West. Cherchesov (transcribed in Austrian German as Tschertschessow) celebrated his biggest successes at the club level in the Austrian premiere Soccer League with FC Tirol (Innsbruck), winning three championship titles in his time there between 1996 and 2002. In Innsbruck Cherchesov is affectionately known as "Stani" to this day.

== International career ==
Cherchesov played for Russia at the 1994 FIFA World Cup and UEFA Euro 1996. He also was named in the squad for the 2002 FIFA World Cup, but was an unused substitute. In total, he made 39 appearances for the team after the dissolution of the Soviet Union. Cherchesov also made one appearance for the FIFA team in the charity game against America in 1995, and for Europe vs Africa in 1997.8

== Managerial career ==
Cherchesov was the manager of Austrian soccer third-tier club FC Kufstein from January to November 2004 and the manager of Wacker Tirol from November 2004 to May 2006. In June 2006 – June 2007 he was the sporting director of FC Spartak Moscow. From 19 June 2007 to 14 August 2008 he was the manager of Spartak Moscow. On 12 July 2008, Spartak suffered a historic crushing 5–1 defeat against CSKA Moscow. On 13 August 2008, Spartak lost another crucial match to Dynamo Kyiv 4–1 in UEFA Champions League qualification. The next day, Cherchesov was sacked by Spartak.

In June 2013, Cherchesov was appointed the manager of Amkar Perm. On 8 April 2014, he left the club.

On 9 April 2014, he was named as manager of Dynamo Moscow replacing Dan Petrescu. He left Dynamo by mutual consent on 13 July 2015.

On 6 October 2015, he became the manager of Polish side Legia Warsaw. That season, he won a league and cup double.

=== Russia ===
In August 2016, Cherchesov was named as the new head coach of Russia on a two-year contract through to the 2018 FIFA World Cup. Under his management Russia would beat Saudi Arabia 5–0, Egypt 3–1, and Spain 1–1 (pen. 4-3), reaching the quarter-finals for the first time since 1970. He has become the first ever Russian manager, since the collapse of USSR, to bring Russia into the knockout stage of a major tournament for the second time (Dutchman Guus Hiddink led Russia to the UEFA Euro 2008 semi-finals), which others like Pavel Sadyrin, Oleg Romantsev, Georgi Yartsev and Leonid Slutsky have failed to do.

On 27 July 2018, he signed a new contract with the Russian national team, on a two-year term with a further two-year extension option. On 12 March 2020, he extended the contract until 30 December 2022. It would be extended to 31 July 2024 if Russia qualifies for the knockout stage at the 2022 FIFA World Cup.

Following the failure to advance from the group stage at the UEFA Euro 2020 which was played in June 2021, the Russian Football Union dismissed Cherchesov on 8 July 2021.

=== Ferencváros ===
On 20 December 2021, he was appointed as the manager of the Nemzeti Bajnokság I club Ferencvárosi TC.

On 5 May 2023, he won the 2022–23 Nemzeti Bajnokság I with Ferencváros, after Kecskemét lost 1–0 to Honvéd at the Bozsik Aréna on the 30th matchday.

However, on 19 July 2023, he was sacked from his management role after losing 3-0 at the Ferencváros Stadion to Klaksvíkar Ítróttarfelag in the first round of the 2023–24 UEFA Champions League qualifying phase and play-off round.

=== Kazakhstan ===
On 3 June 2024, Cherchesov was hired to manage the Kazakhstan national team.

At the end of June of the same year, Cherchesov became the subject of a controversy. During a press conference, he objected to a journalist asking several questions in a row in Kazakh. A couple of days later, Cherchesov began attending Kazakh language courses, and said that he had plans to master the language by the end of the year.

Under Cherchesov, Kazakhstan had a catastrophic 2024–25 UEFA Nations League B campaign, as Kazakhstan got relegated with no goal to their name and only one point, obtained from Norway, the team that would later get promoted to League A next season. As a result, Cherchesov was sacked for failing to achieve promotion.

=== Return to Akhmat ===
On 6 August 2025, Cherchesov signed a three-year contract with Akhmat Grozny (which was called Terek during his first stint at the club). On 2 November 2026, Cherchesov left Akhmat by mutual consent following a series of 5 consecutive losses and gaining 1 point in 7 games.

== Personal life ==
Cherchesov is married and has two children. His son, Stanislav, is also a goalkeeper. As he spent much time in Germany and Austria during his career, he is fluent in German and has taken up coaching education in Germany.

In the year 2018, Cherchesov was named "Coach of the Year" in the nomination "Pride of Russia" by the Ministry of Sport of Russia.

== Managerial statistics ==
As of match played 31 October 2026

Managerial record by team and tenure
Team	Nat	From	To	Record								Ref
Team	Nat	From	To	G	W	D	L	GF	GA	GD	Win %	Ref
FC Kufstein	(Austria)	1 January 2004	8 November 2004	30	16	6	8	55	38	+17	53.33	
Wacker Innsbruck	(Austria)	9 November 2004	1 June 2006	59	18	20	21	79	79	+0	30.51	
Spartak Moscow	(Russia)	19 June 2007	14 August 2008	47	25	14	8	85	55	+30	53.19	
FC Zhemchuzhina-Sochi	(Russia)	16 December 2010	6 August 2011	21	9	2	10	27	29	−2	42.86	
Terek Grozny	(Russia)	27 September 2011	26 May 2013	53	24	10	19	70	70	+0	45.28	
Amkar Perm	(Russia)	17 June 2013	8 April 2014	25	9	8	8	36	33	+3	36.00	
Dynamo Moscow	(Russia)	10 April 2014	13 July 2015	51	26	12	13	87	58	+29	50.98	
Legia Warsaw	(Poland)	6 October 2015	1 June 2016	35	23	6	6	63	20	+43	65.71	
Russia	(Russia)	11 August 2016	8 July 2021	57	24	13	20	99	78	+21	42.11	
Ferencváros	(Hungary)	20 December 2021	19 July 2023	72	39	13	20	124	78	+46	54.17	
Kazakhstan	(Kazakhstan)	3 June 2024	28 January 2025	6	0	1	5	0	15	−15	0.00	
Akhmat Grozny	(Russia)	6 August 2025	2 November 2026	50	13	18	19	60	68	−8	26.00	
Total				506	226	123	157	785	621	+164	44.66	—

== Honours ==
=== Player ===
Spartak Moscow

- Soviet Top League/Russian Premier League: 1987, 1989, 1992, 1993
- Soviet Cup: 1992

Tirol Innsbruck

- Austrian Bundesliga: 1999–2000, 2000–01, 2001–02

Individual

- Soviet Top League Best Goalkeeper: 1989, 1990, 1992

=== Manager ===
Legia Warsaw

- Ekstraklasa: 2015–16
- Polish Cup: 2015–16

Ferencváros

- Nemzeti Bajnokság I: 2021–22, 2022–23
- Hungarian Cup: 2021–22
