= Aleksander Knavs =

Slovenian footballer (born 1975)

Personal information
- Date of birth: 5 December 1975 (age 50)
- Place of birth: Maribor, SFR Yugoslavia
- Height: 1.90 m (6 ft 3 in)
- Position: Defender

Youth career
- Olimpija

Senior career*
Years	Team	Apps	(Gls)
1993–1997	Olimpija	70	(5)
1997–2001	Tirol Innsbruck	113	(6)
2001–2004	1. FC Kaiserslautern	64	(3)
2004–2005	VfL Bochum	26	(1)
2005–2008	Red Bull Salzburg	30	(1)
Total		303	(16)

International career
1993	Slovenia U18	2	(0)
1993–1997	Slovenia U21	17	(0)
1998–2006	Slovenia	65	(3)
- * Club domestic league appearances and goals

Aleksander Knavs (born 5 December 1975) is a Slovenian retired football defender.

== Club career ==
Knavs was born in Maribor and started his professional career playing at the club Olimpija from the Slovenian capital city of Ljubljana in 1993. He played for Olimpija until June 1997 and went on to move abroad by signing with Austrian club Tirol Innsbruck after being noticed by Kurt Jara, the club's manager at the time. Playing for Olimpija, Knavs appeared in 70 domestic league matches and scored five goals for the club in the league. He also won the Slovenian championship twice with the club, in 1994 and 1995.

Knavs won two consecutive champions titles in the Austrian Bundesliga with Tirol Innsbruck in 2000 and 2001, before he went on to sign with German Bundesliga side 1. FC Kaiserslautern in July 2001. He played for Kaiserslautern in the next three seasons, appearing in 64 Bundesliga matches and scoring three goals for the club in the league before leaving it for another Bundesliga team, VfL Bochum, in June 2004. He spent only one season with Bochum and left the club after their relegation to the 2. Bundesliga at the end of the 2004–05 season, making 26 Bundesliga appearances and scoring one goal for the club in the league. He subsequently returned to Austria by signing with Red Bull Salzburg in July 2005. He stayed there three seasons, making 30 appearances and scoring one goal.

He retired from football in 2008, aged 32.

== International career ==
Knavs went on to make his debut for the Slovenian national team playing as a substitute in the final ten minutes of their friendly match against Iceland on 5 February 1998 during an international friendly tournament in Cyprus. He became a regular in the Slovenian national team already during the same year and subsequently appeared in ten out of possible twelve matches in the qualifying session for the Euro 2000. He also managed to score one goal in the team's away match against Georgia that ended in a 1–1 draw. The Slovenian team surprisingly qualified for the finals after beating Ukraine 3–2 on aggregate in the play-offs. Knavs also appeared in two group matches at the final Euro 2000 tournament, playing as a substitute in the last 22 minutes of the second match against Spain as well as all 90 minutes in the final group match against Norway. With two points scored, Slovenia finished last out of four teams in their group and was eliminated from the tournament in the first round.

He continued to play for the Slovenian national team in the qualifying session for the 2002 World Cup, appearing in nine out of possible twelve qualifying matches and scoring one goal in the team's away match against Russia that ended in a 1–1 draw. Slovenia went on to qualify for their second consecutive major tournament after beating Romania 3–2 on aggregate in the play-offs. Knavs was also part of the Slovenian team at the 2002 World Cup finals and appeared in two group matches before the team was eliminated from the tournament in the first round by finishing last out of four teams in their group, scoring no points. He played the entire first match against Spain and was also a starting player in the second match against South Africa, but was substituted in the 60th minute.

With the Slovenian national team, he also appeared in seven out of possible ten matches in the qualifying session for the Euro 2004 and scored one goal in the team's 3–1 victory over Israel at home. The Slovenian team did not manage to qualify for the finals after being defeated 2–1 on aggregate by Croatia in the play-offs. He also appeared in seven out of possible ten matches in the qualifying session for the 2006 World Cup, where the Slovenian team finished only fourth in their group, behind Italy, Norway and Scotland.

He made his international comeback in August 2006 after ten months of absence from the national team, playing all 90 minutes in Slovenia's friendly match against Israel. His last match for national team was during qualifying campaign for the Euro 2008 in their first qualifier against Bulgaria, which they lost 3–0. In all, Knavs won 65 international caps and scored three goals for Slovenia. He occasionally captained his national side.

== Career statistics ==
=== Club ===
Club performance			League		Cup		League Cup		Continental		Total	
Season	Club	League	Apps	Goals	Apps	Goals	Apps	Goals	Apps	Goals	Apps	Goals
Slovenia			League		Slovenian Cup		League Cup		Europe		Total	
1993–94	Olimpija	PrvaLiga	8	1			—		—			
1994–95	Olimpija	PrvaLiga	18	2			—		4	0		
1995–96	Olimpija	PrvaLiga	22	1			—		4	0		
1996–97	Olimpija	PrvaLiga	21	1			—		1	0		
Austria			League		Austrian Cup		League Cup		Europe		Total	
1997–98	Innsbruck	Bundesliga	32	3	1	0	—		2	0	35	3
1998–99	Innsbruck	Bundesliga	21	1	0	0	—		—		21	1
1999–00	Innsbruck	Bundesliga	29	1	0	0	—		—		29	1
2000–01	Innsbruck	Bundesliga	31	1	0	0	—		5	0	36	1
Germany			League		DFB-Pokal		Other		Europe		Total	
2001–02	Kaiserslautern	Bundesliga	23	0	2	1	—		—		25	1
2002–03	Kaiserslautern	Bundesliga	16	2	3	0	—		2	0	21	2
2003–04	Kaiserslautern	Bundesliga	25	1	1	0	—		1	0	27	1
2004–05	Bochum	Bundesliga	26	1	2	0	1	0	2	0	31	1
Austria			League		Austrian Cup		League Cup		Europe		Total	
2005–06	Salzburg	Bundesliga	28	1	0	0	—		—		28	1
2006–07	Salzburg	Bundesliga	0	0	0	0	—		—		0	0
2007–08	Salzburg	Bundesliga	2	0	0	0	—		—		2	0
Total	Slovenia		70	5			0	0	9	0		
Total	Austria		143	7	1	0	0	0	7	0	151	7
Total	Germany		90	4	8	1	1	0	5	0	104	5
Career total			303	16			1	0	21	0		

=== International goals ===
Scores and results list Slovenia's goal tally first.

#	Date	Venue	Opponent	Score	Result	Competition
1	27 March 1999	Boris Paichadze Stadium, Tbilisi	Georgia	1–1	1–1	UEFA Euro 2000 qualification
2	24 March 2001	Luzhniki Stadium, Moscow	Russia	1–1	1–1	FIFA World Cup 2002 qualification
3	6 September 2003	Stadion Bežigrad, Ljubljana	Israel	2–0	3–1	UEFA Euro 2004 qualification

== Honours ==
Olimpija

- Slovenian Championship: 1993–94, 1994–95
  - Runner-up: 1995–96
- Slovenian Cup: 1995–96

Tirol Innsbruck

- Bundesliga: 1999–00, 2000–01
- ÖFB-Cup:
  - Runner-up: 2001

Kaiserslautern

- DFB-Pokal:
  - Runner-up: 2002–03

== See also ==
- Slovenian international players
