= Andreas Schiener =

Austrian footballer

Personal information
- Date of birth: 30 November 1974 (age 51)
- Place of birth: Mödling, Austria
- Height: 1.82 m (6 ft 0 in)
- Position: Midfielder

Senior career*
Years	Team	Apps	(Gls)
1993–1995	Admira Wacker Wien	51	(11)
1995–1997	FC Tirol Innsbruck	62	(6)
1997–1999	FK Austria Wien	14	(1)
1999–2000	WSG Wattens	17	(1)
2000–2002	FC Tirol Innsbruck	19	(1)
2002–2005	LASK Linz	84	(6)
2005–2010	FC Waidhofen/Ybbs	100	(11)

International career
1994–1995	Austria U-21	11	(0)
- * Club domestic league appearances and goals

Andreas Schiener (born 30 November 1974) is a retired Austrian football midfielder.

== Honours ==
- Austrian Football Bundesliga winner: 2000–01, 2001–02
- Austrian Regionalliga Ost winner: 2009–10
