= Marco Zwyssig =

Swiss footballer (born 1971)

Personal information
- Full name: Marco Zwyssig
- Date of birth: 24 October 1971 (age 55)
- Place of birth: St. Gallen, Switzerland
- Height: 1.90 m (6 ft 3 in)
- Position: Centre-back

Youth career
- 1979–1992: St. Gallen

Senior career*
Years	Team	Apps	(Gls)
1992–1996	Gossau		
1996–2001	St. Gallen	161	(11)
2001–2002	Tirol Innsbruck	14	(2)
2002–2005	Basel	93	(3)

International career
2000–2004	Switzerland	20	(1)
- * Club domestic league appearances and goals

Marco Zwyssig (born 24 October 1971) is a Swiss former professional footballer who played as a centre-back. He is best remembered for his time at FC St. Gallen and FC Basel. He also played for the Switzerland national football team. Following his retirement from active football Zwyssig works partly independently, partly as a course leader and lecturer in adult education.

== Football career ==
=== Gossau ===
Zwyssig played his youth football with FC St. Gallen coming through the ranks up to their U-21 team. In 1992, as he started studying business economics, he left the club and joined local amateur club FC Gossau in the third tier of Swiss football. Here he played as centre back directly behind player-coach Roger Hegi. They were champions of group 4 and, after the play-offs, achieved promotion at the end of the 1992–93 season. After two years in the second tier, Gossau suffered relegation, but in the following 1995–96 season again won the group 4 championship and again achieved promotion in the play-offs.

=== St. Gallen ===
At this point FC St. Gallen hired Hegi, who had retired from his active playing career, as their new head-coach. Hegi persuaded Zwissig to come with him to play with St.Gallen in the 1996–97 Nationalliga A. He did, signing a semi-professional contract and he achieved to become a regular player immediately. After graduating in 1997, he signed his first professional contract. Under Hegi's successor Marcel Koller, Zwyssig remained regular starter and in the 1999–2000 Nationalliga A they won the Swiss championship. Thus, they qualified for the next season's Champions League third qualifying round, but here they were beaten 4–3 on aggregate by Galatasaray. St. Gallen continued in the UEFA Cup first round, beating Chelsea 2–1 on aggregate they advanced to the second round, but were beaten 3–2 on aggregate by Club Brugge.

=== Wacker Tirol ===
Zwissig then moved to Austrian Bundesliga club Wacker Tirol in 2001, where he won the Austrian championship in their 2001–02 season. Zwyssig had experienced a difficult time in Innsbruck. At first the wages were not paid on time and then not paid at all. Wacker Tirol filed bankruptcy and they were forced to sell their most valuable players; Zwyssig inevitably left the club in the winter break of that season. Unavoidably, he had to take legal action against them.

=== Basel ===
Zwyssig signed for FC Basel in January 2002 and the FCB management transferred CHF 1.5 million as a transfer fee to the Austrians. He joined Basel's first team during their 2001–02 season under head coach Christian Gross. After playing in three test games Zwissig played his team debut in the Swiss Cup game on 17 February 2002 as Basel won 1–0 against Colombier. He played his domestic league debut for the team one week later in the away game in the Cornaredo as Basel won 5–2 against Lugano. Ironically, he scored his first goal for his new team on 4 April in the away game in the Espenmoos as Basel won 3–1 against his former club St. Gallen. Basel won the last game of the season, on 8 May 2002, and became champions ten points clear at the top of the table. Just four days later they played in the cup final against Grasshopper Club winning 2–1 in extra time they won the double.

Basel's 2002–03 UEFA Champions League season started in the second qualifying round. After beating Žilina 4–1 on aggregate and Celtic on the away goals rule after a 3–3 aggregate, Basel advanced to the group stage. They ended this in second position behind Valencia, but ahead of Liverpool and Spartak Moscow to advance to the second group stage. They ended this in third position behind Manchester United and Juventus, but ahead of Deportivo La Coruña. Zwyssig played in 12 of these 16 games. Basel ended their league season as runners-up, but in the cup they advanced to the final and here they beat Xamax 6–0 to defend the title.

As cup winners Basel were qualified for the UEFA Cup first round and here they beat Malatyaspor 3-2 on aggregate due to the silver goal rule. However, in the second round they lost both games against Newcastle United. Zwissig played in all four games. In their 2003–04 league season the team started well, winning their first 13 matches straight out. The first defeat came on matchday 24. Basel won the championship with 26 victories and seven draws, the team had suffered just three away defeats, and obtained 85 points. Zwissig had 30 appearances in the 36 fixtures. However in the cup the team were eliminated early, in round three, Zwissig scored a goal in the first round against FC Alle and in the second round against Urania Genève Sport.

As reigning Swiss champions, Basel entered 2004–05 UEFA Champions League in the third qualifying round, however, drawn against Internazionale, who won the qualifier 5–2 on aggregate. Basel subsequently dropped into the 2004–05 UEFA Cup. Beating Terek Grozny in the first round, Basel qualified for the group stage. A 1–1 draw away against Schalke 04 was followed by a home defeat against Hearts. But with two victories, 2–1 away against Ferencvárosi TC and 1–0 at home against Feyenoord, saw Basel rise to third place in the group table and advance to the knock-out stage. In the round of 32 in the 2004–05 UEFA Cup, a home game in the St. Jakob-Park on 17 February 2005, Basel played a goalless draw against Lille OSC, but the return leg were defeated 2–0 and were eliminated. Basel completed all the 2004–05 Super League season's seventeen home games undefeated, winning thirteen and drawing four. They ended the season as Swiss champions with 10 points advantage over second placed Thun. In the first round of the 2004–05 Swiss Cup Basel played away against local amateur club FC Oberdorf winning 4–0. In the second round they beat lower league team Meyrin 3–1. But in round three they faced Thun. Following a 1–1 draw after extra time, Basel lost the penalty shoot-out 4–3.

At the end of the season Zwissig retired from his active football career. He played a total of 173 games for Basel scoring a total of five goals. 93 of these games were in the Swiss Super League, 14 in the Swiss Cup, 23 in the UEFA competitions (Champions League and UEFA Cup) and 43 were friendly games. He scored three goals in the domestic league and two in the cup.

=== International ===
He played for the national team between 2000 and 2004 but never really broke into the first team due to the amount of competition for places. He got 20 caps and 1 goal and was an unused substitute at the 2004 European Football Championship.

== Private life ==
Zwyssig studied business economics with a focus on marketing at the University of St. Gallen and graduated in 1997. Following his retirement from active football Zwyssig worked partly independently, partly as a course leader and lecturer in adult education. On 11 June 2021 the ASF-SFV announced that as of 1 July 2021 Zwyssig would be the Footeco boss for the Zurich and St.Gallen regions and is responsible for the development, support and observation of players and coaches at Footeco and U-15 level.

== Honours ==
Gossau

- Promotion to Nationalliga B: 1992–93, 1995–96

St.Gallen

- Swiss Super League: 1999–2000

Wacker Tirol

- Austrian Bundesliga: 2001–02

Basel

- Swiss Super League: 2001–02, 2003–04, 2004–05
- Swiss Cup: 2002–03,

== Sources ==
- Die ersten 125 Jahre. Publisher: Josef Zindel im Friedrich Reinhardt Verlag, Basel. ISBN 978-3-7245-2305-5
- Verein "Basler Fussballarchiv" Homepage
