= 1995–96 Austrian Football Bundesliga =

78th season of top-tier football league in Austria

Austrian Bundesliga
- Season: 1995–96
- Champions: SK Rapid Wien
- Top goalscorer: Ivica Vastić (20)

Statistics of Austrian Football Bundesliga in the 1995–96 season.

== Overview ==
It was contested by 10 teams, and SK Rapid Wien won the championship.

=== Teams and location ===
Location of teams in the 1995–96 Austrian Football Bundesliga

Teams of 1995–96 Austrian Football Bundesliga

- FC Admira/Wacker
- Austria Salzburg
- Austria Wien
- Grazer AK
- LASK
- Rapid Wien
- SV Ried
- Sturm Graz
- Tirol Innsbruck
- Vorwärts Steyr

== League standings ==
Pos	Team	Pld	W	D	L	GF	GA	GD	Pts	Qualification or relegation
1	Rapid Wien (C)	36	22	7	7	68	38	+30	73	Qualification to Champions League qualifying round
2	Sturm Graz	36	20	7	9	61	35	+26	67	Qualification to Cup Winners' Cup first round
3	Tirol Innsbruck	36	18	8	10	64	40	+24	62	Qualification to UEFA Cup qualifying round
4	Grazer AK	36	14	15	7	46	36	+10	57	Qualification to UEFA Cup qualifying round
5	Austria Wien	36	14	9	13	42	35	+7	51	Qualification to Intertoto Cup group stage
6	LASK Linz	36	13	9	14	36	35	+1	48	Qualification to Intertoto Cup group stage
7	Ried	36	11	14	11	47	53	−6	47	Qualification to Intertoto Cup group stage
8	Austria Salzburg	36	10	14	12	53	51	+2	44	
9	Admira/Wacker (O)	36	7	13	16	35	61	−26	34	Qualification for relegation play-offs
10	Vorwärts Steyr (R)	36	0	6	30	25	93	−68	6	Relegation to Austrian First Football League

Source: weltfussball.de (in German)
(C) Champions; (O) Play-off winners; (R) Relegated

== Results ==
Teams played each other four times in the league. In the first half of the season each team played every other team twice (home and away), and then did the same in the second half of the season.

=== First half of season ===
Home \ Away	ADM	ASZ	AWI	GAK	LIN	RWI	RIE	STU	TIR	VOR
Admira/Wacker		1–2	1–1	0–2	0–1	1–1	3–2	1–5	0–0	4–1
Austria Salzburg	2–2		2–2	2–1	1–1	0–3	1–1	1–1	3–1	4–0
Austria Wien	3–1	3–0		3–2	0–1	4–1	0–0	0–3	1–0	4–0
Grazer AK	1–1	0–0	0–0		1–0	1–2	4–2	3–2	3–0	1–1
LASK Linz	2–0	0–0	0–1	0–0		2–0	1–1	2–1	1–2	1–0
Rapid Wien	1–1	3–1	1–0	3–1	1–1		4–1	0–2	3–1	4–3
Ried	2–2	0–0	0–0	0–0	1–0	2–1		2–4	2–1	3–1
Sturm Graz	0–0	2–1	2–0	1–1	3–1	0–1	1–0		2–0	4–2
Tirol Innsbruck	3–0	1–1	3–1	1–1	2–1	1–2	2–0	2–2		5–1
Vorwärts Steyr	0–1	0–6	0–0	1–2	0–3	0–2	0–2	1–3	2–2	

Source: weltfussball.de (in German)
Legend: Blue = home team win; Yellow = draw; Red = away team win.

=== Second half of season ===
Home \ Away	ADM	ASZ	AWI	GAK	LIN	RWI	RIE	STU	TIR	VOR
Admira/Wacker		2–2	0–3	1–1	0–1	0–0	1–3	0–2	1–4	3–0
Austria Salzburg	2–2		1–1	0–0	3–0	4–2	0–3	1–2	0–2	4–0
Austria Wien	0–1	2–0		0–1	3–0	0–2	2–0	0–1	1–0	2–0
Grazer AK	2–0	2–1	2–2		1–0	1–1	1–1	1–0	1–3	3–2
LASK Linz	0–0	3–0	2–0	1–1		0–2	0–0	2–1	1–1	3–1
Rapid Wien	6–0	3–1	0–1	1–0	2–1		4–2	2–0	3–1	2–0
Ried	2–3	1–1	1–0	2–2	1–0	1–1		2–2	0–6	1–1
Sturm Graz	2–0	2–1	3–0	0–2	2–1	1–0	3–1		0–1	0–0
Tirol Innsbruck	2–0	3–1	2–0	2–0	2–1	1–1	0–3	1–1		3–0
Vorwärts Steyr	0–2	1–3	2–2	0–1	1–2	2–3	1–2	1–3	0–3	

Source: weltfussball.de (in German)
Legend: Blue = home team win; Yellow = draw; Red = away team win.

== Relegation play-offs ==
Team 1	Agg.	Team 2	1st leg	2nd leg
Admira/Wacker	9–4	Gerasdorf	3–4	6–0

== Top goalscorers ==
Rank	Scorer	Club	Goals
1	(Austria) Ivica Vastić	Sturm Graz	20
2	(Austria) Christian Stumpf	Rapid Wien	15
3	(Austria) Heimo Pfeifenberger	Austria Salzburg	14
4	(Austria) Mario Haas	Sturm Graz	12
5	(Norway) Mons Ivar Mjelde	Austria Wien	11
6	(Austria) Arnold Wetl	Sturm Graz	10
7	(Poland) Jerzy Brzęczek	Tirol Innsbruck	9
7	(Austria) Thomas Janeschitz	Tirol Innsbruck	9
7	(Austria) Gernot Krinner	Tirol Innsbruck	9

== Attendances ==
#	Club	Average
1	Rapid	12,306
2	Salzburg	10,250
3	Sturm	7,361
4	Tirol	7,206
5	LASK	7,017
6	Ried	6,372
7	Austria	5,456
8	GAK	5,417
9	Steyr	2,761
10	Admira	2,139
