= Radosław Gilewicz =

Polish footballer (born 1971)

Personal information
- Full name: Radosław Gilewicz
- Date of birth: 8 May 1971 (age 55)
- Place of birth: Chełm, Poland
- Height: 1.74 m (5 ft 9 in)
- Positions: Midfielder; striker

Senior career*
Years	Team	Apps	(Gls)
1991–1992	GKS Tychy		
1992–1993	Ruch Chorzów	31	(15)
1993–1995	St. Gallen	21	(7)
1995–1997	VfB Stuttgart	44	(6)
1997–1998	Karlsruher SC	34	(6)
1999–2002	Tirol Innsbruck	103	(59)
2002–2005	Austria Wien	81	(29)
2005–2007	FC Superfund	57	(11)
2007–2008	Polonia Warsaw	15	(3)
2010	SV Lackenbach	2	(0)
Total		388	(136)

International career
1997–2001	Poland	10	(0)
- * Club domestic league appearances and goals

Radosław Gilewicz (born 8 May 1971) is a Polish football pundit, co-commentator and former player who played as a midfielder or as a striker.

== Club career ==
Born in Chełm, Gilewicz started his career in 1991 playing for GKS Tychy. In 1992, he transferred to Ruch Chorzów.

From 1993 to 1995 Gilewicz played for FC St. Gallen. He later moved to VfB Stuttgart where he stayed for two years before once again moving to Karlsruher SC. He played his final game for Karlsruhe in the final of DFB-Pokal, a game he entered late on as a substitute.

He then moved to Austria in 1999 where he played for FC Tirol Innsbruck. In the 2000–01 season, he scored 22 goals for the Tyroleans and was the league's top scorer. He stayed at the club until it went into liquidation. From 2002 until 2005 he was with Austria Wien. Next he played for FC Superfund. He has won the Austrian title four times and has won the Austrian Cup twice and is the Polish all-time top goalscorer in Austrian football.

He played for Polonia Warsaw until the summer of 2008, and had a short spell with SV Lackenbach in 2010 before retiring.

== Personal life ==
He is married and has two children, Konrad and Jasmina. Konrad was also a footballer.

== Honours ==
VfB Stuttgart

- DFB-Pokal: 1996–97

Tirol Innsbruck

- Austrian Bundesliga: 1999–2000, 2000–01, 2001–02

Austria Wien

- Austrian Bundesliga: 2002–03
- Austrian Cup: 2002–03, 2004–05

Individual

- Austrian Footballer of the Year: 2000
- Austrian Bundesliga top scorer: 2000–01
