= Konrad Gilewicz =

Polish footballer

Personal information
- Date of birth: 4 February 1991 (age 35)
- Place of birth: Tychy, Poland
- Height: 1.74 m (5 ft 9 in)
- Position: Midfielder

Youth career
- 1999–2002: Tirol Innsbruck
- 2002–2005: Austria Wien
- 2005–2007: Pasching
- 2007–2008: Kosa Konstancin
- 2008–2010: Ruch Chorzów

Senior career*
Years	Team	Apps	(Gls)
2010–2012	Wacker Innsbruck	0	(0)
2010	→ SV Hall (loan)	6	(1)
2011–2012	Wacker Innsbruck II	15	(1)
2012	ŠTK 1914 Šamorín		
2013	Flota Świnoujście	3	(0)
2014–2015	ROW Rybnik	17	(1)
2015–2016	Ruch Chorzów II	15	(1)
- * Club domestic league appearances and goals

Konrad Gilewicz (born 4 February 1992) is a Polish former professional footballer who played as a midfielder.

== Career ==
In 2010, Gilewicz signed for Austrian top flight side Wacker. After that, he was sent on loan to SV Hall in the Austrian fourth tier. In 2012, he signed for Slovak club ŠTK 1914 Šamorín. Before the second half of 2012–13, Gilewicz signed for Flota Świnoujście in the Polish second tier, where he made 3 league appearances and scored 0 goals. On 17 March 2013, he debuted for Flota Świnoujście during a 1–2 loss to Polonia Bytom. In 2015, he signed for Polish fourth tier team Ruch Chorzów II.

== Personal life ==
He is the son of a former Poland international Radosław Gilewicz.
