= Jerzy Brzęczek =

Polish footballer

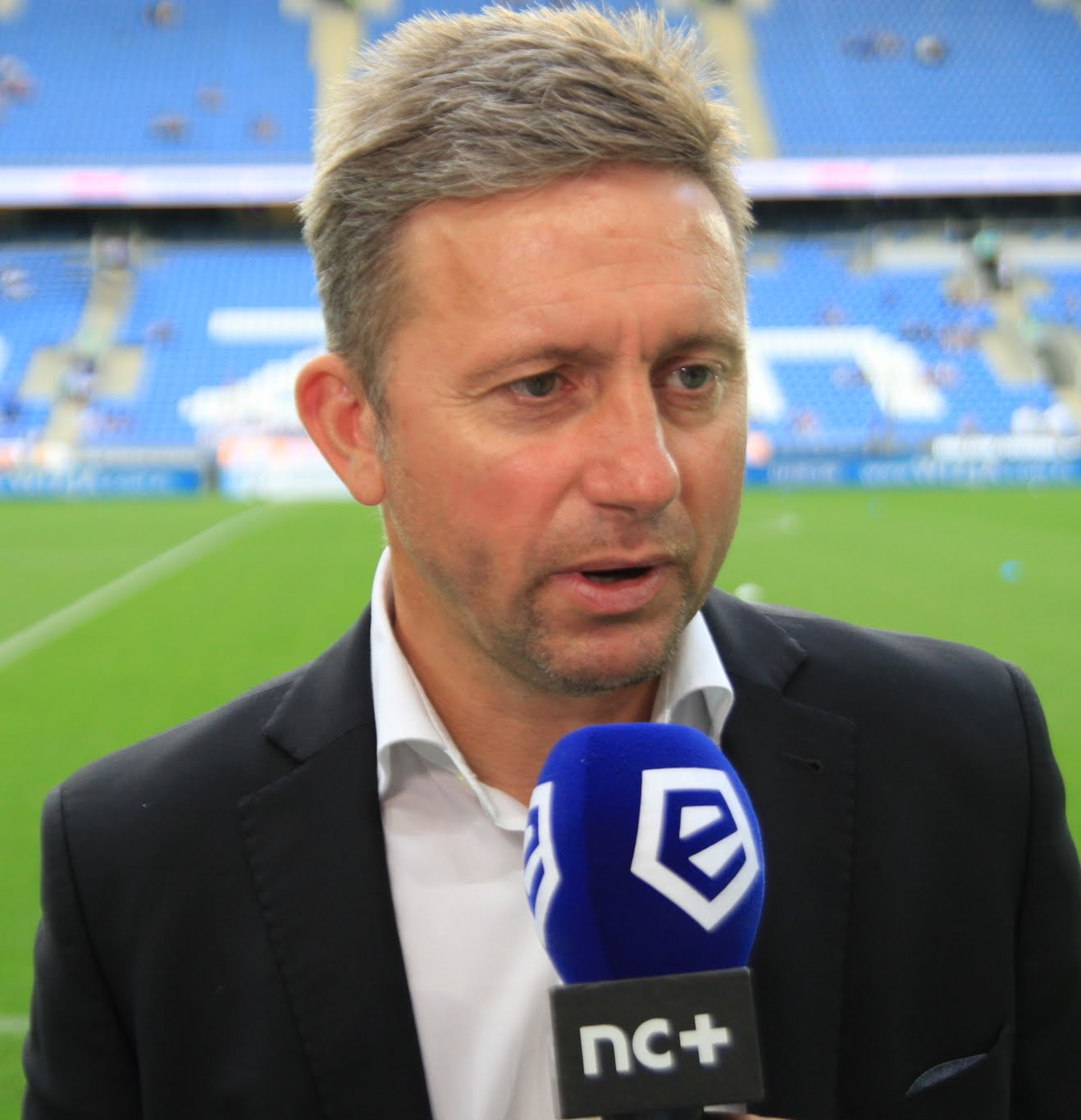
- Brzęczek in 2015

Personal information
- Full name: Jerzy Józef Brzęczek
- Date of birth: 18 March 1971 (age 55)
- Place of birth: Truskolasy, Poland
- Height: 1.74 m (5 ft 9 in)
- Position: Midfielder

Team information
- Current team: Poland U21 (manager)

Senior career*
Years	Team	Apps	(Gls)
1987–1988	Raków Częstochowa		
1988–1992	Olimpia Poznań	108	(8)
1992–1993	Lech Poznań	29	(3)
1993–1994	Górnik Zabrze	46	(6)
1994–1995	GKS Katowice	15	(3)
1995–1998	Tirol Innsbruck	85	(11)
1998–1999	LASK	33	(2)
1999–2000	Maccabi Haifa	47	(11)
2000–2002	Tirol Innsbruck	62	(7)
2002–2003	Sturm Graz	35	(2)
2003–2004	FC Kärnten	13	(0)
2004–2007	Wacker Tirol	79	(8)
2007–2008	Górnik Zabrze	42	(5)
2008–2009	Polonia Bytom	9	(0)
Total		602	(66)

International career
- Poland Olympic
1992–1999	Poland	42	(4)

Managerial career
- 2010–2014: Raków Częstochowa
- 2014–2015: Lechia Gdańsk
- 2015–2017: GKS Katowice
- 2017–2018: Wisła Płock
- 2018–2021: Poland
- 2022: Wisła Kraków
- 2025–: Poland U21
Medal record
Representing Poland
Men's football
Olympic Games
Silver medal – second place	1992 Barcelona	Team
- * Club domestic league appearances and goals

Jerzy Józef Brzęczek (Polish pronunciation: [ˈjɛʐɨ ˈjuzɛv ˈbʐɛnt͡ʂɛk]; (Note: In isolation, ''Józef" is pronounced [ˈjuzɛf].) born 18 March 1971) is a Polish professional football manager and former player. He currently manages the Poland national under-21 team.

In a professional career which spanned nearly 20 years and brought 42 caps with the Poland national team, Brzęczek played for clubs in Poland, Austria and Israel. From 2018 to 2021, he was the head coach for the Poland national team.

== Club career ==
During his career, Brzęczek played for Raków Częstochowa, Olimpia Poznań, Lech Poznań, Górnik Zabrze (two spells), GKS Katowice, Tirol Innsbruck (later Wacker Tirol), LASK Linz, Maccabi Haifa, Sturm Graz, FC Kärnten and Polonia Bytom, retiring in 2009 at age 38. Brzęczek picked up championship medals in both Poland (with Lech Poznań in 1993) and Austria (with Tirol Innsbruck in 2001 and 2002).

== International career ==
With 42 caps for the Poland national team to his credit, Brzęczek also represented the national team at the 1992 Summer Olympics, winning silver.

== Managerial career ==
=== Clubs ===
On 17 November 2014, Brzęczek became the coach of Lechia Gdańsk, and was sacked on 1 September 2015. Then, from the end of September 2015, he was a manager for GKS Katowice. On 20 May 2017, after losing a game against MKS Kluczbork and losing the chances of promotion to the Ekstraklasa, he resigned. On 11 July 2017, Brzęczek became the coach of Wisła Płock.

=== Poland ===
On 12 July 2018, Brzęczek was announced as the new head coach of the Poland national team.

His tenure didn't start off well, with Poland finishing last in their 2018–19 UEFA Nations League A group, following two losses and two draws. Poland's UEFA Euro 2020 qualifying was more impressive, with the team managing to win four opening matches without conceding a goal. However, after a 2–0 away defeat to Slovenia and a home draw to Austria, Brzęczek faced heavy pressure from the fans calling for his dismissal. Despite this, he managed to keep the team on track with two final wins over Latvia and North Macedonia, eventually qualifying for the UEFA Euro 2020 from the top spot in their group.

Brzęczek was sacked on 18 January 2021, five months before Poland's first match at the UEFA Euro 2020 and succeeded by the Portugal's Paulo Sousa.

=== Wisła Kraków ===
On 14 February 2022, Brzęczek was appointed head coach of Wisła Kraków, replacing Adrián Guľa. Achieving only one win in 13 league games, he was not able to save Wisła from relegation to I liga, their first since they returned to the top division in 1996. With five wins and two draws in 12 games at the start of Wisła's 2022–23 league campaign, Brzęczek left the club.

=== Poland U21 ===
On 8 August 2025, Brzęczek became the new manager of the Poland national under-21 team. He led his team to qualify for the UEFA Under-21 Euro 2027 as the best runners-up, after a nine-game winning streak and a loss to Italy in the final qualifying match.

== Personal life ==
Brzęczek's nephew is a footballer, winger Jakub Błaszczykowski, who has most notably represented Wisła Kraków, Borussia Dortmund and VfL Wolfsburg. His sister, Błaszczykowski's mother, was murdered by her husband which caused family separation.

== Career statistics ==
=== International ===
Appearances and goals by national team and year
National team	Year	Apps	Goals
Poland	1992	7	0
Poland	1993	11	1
Poland	1994	5	1
Poland	1995	0	0
Poland	1996	2	0
Poland	1997	4	0
Poland	1998	7	1
Poland	1999	6	1
Total		42	4

Scores and results list Poland's goal tally first, score column indicates score after each Brzęczek goal.

List of international goals scored by Jerzy Brzęczek
No.	Date	Venue	Opponent	Score	Result	Competition
1	17 March 1993	Ribeirão Preto, Brazil	Brazil	1–0	2–2	Friendly
2	17 May 1994	Katowice, Poland	Austria	2–2	3–4	Friendly
3	10 October 1998	Warsaw, Poland	Luxembourg	1–0	3–0	UEFA Euro 2000 qualifying
4	27 March 1999	London, England	England	1–2	1–3	UEFA Euro 2000 qualifying

== Managerial statistics ==
As of match played 17 November 2026

Managerial record by team and tenure
Team	From	To	Record				
Team	From	To	G	W	D	L	Win %
(Poland) Raków Częstochowa	9 February 2010	4 November 2014	171	57	50	64	33.33
(Poland) Lechia Gdańsk	17 November 2014	1 September 2015	30	11	9	10	36.67
(Poland) GKS Katowice	28 September 2015	20 May 2017	56	25	14	17	44.64
(Poland) Wisła Płock	11 July 2017	11 July 2018	38	17	6	15	44.74
Poland	12 July 2018	18 January 2021	24	12	5	7	50.00
(Poland) Wisła Kraków	14 February 2022	3 October 2022	27	7	9	11	25.93
Poland U21	8 August 2025	Present	12	11	0	1	91.67
Total			358	140	93	125	39.11

== Honours ==
=== Player ===
Lech Poznań

- Ekstraklasa: 1992–93

Tirol Innsbruck

- Austrian Bundesliga: 2000–01, 2001–02

Poland Olympic

- Olympic silver medal: 1992

=== Manager ===
Individual

- Ekstraklasa Coach of the Month: September 2017, December 2017, April 2018
