= 2004–05 Austrian Football Bundesliga =

87th season of top-tier football league in Austria

Austrian Bundesliga
- Season: 2004–05
- Dates: 13 July 2004 – 29 May 2005
- Champions: SK Rapid Wien
- Matches: 180
- Goals: 478 (2.66 per match)

Statistics of Austrian Football Bundesliga in the 2004–05 season.

== Overview ==
The matches for the 2004/05 Austrian football championship were played in the " T-Mobile Bundesliga", the highest league in Austria. The second league was sponsored by the Red-Zac-Erste-Liga, and the third division teams played in the three regional leagues West, Middle and East for promotion to the First League.

It was contested by 10 teams, and SK Rapid Wien won the championship.

== League standings ==
Pos	Team	Pld	W	D	L	GF	GA	GD	Pts	Qualification or relegation
1	Rapid Wien (C)	36	21	8	7	67	31	+36	71	Qualification to Champions League second qualifying round
2	Grazer AK	36	21	7	8	58	28	+30	70	Qualification to UEFA Cup second qualifying round
3	Austria Wien	36	19	12	5	64	24	+40	69	Qualification to UEFA Cup second qualifying round
4	Pasching	36	17	9	10	53	48	+5	60	Qualification to UEFA Cup second qualifying round
5	Mattersburg	36	12	9	15	48	58	−10	45	
6	Wacker Tirol	36	11	11	14	48	48	0	44	
7	Sturm Graz	36	10	10	16	37	47	−10	40	Qualification to Intertoto Cup second round
8	Admira Wacker Mödling	36	10	8	18	36	63	−27	38	
9	Austria Salzburg	36	9	9	18	37	51	−14	36	
10	Bregenz (R)	36	4	9	23	30	80	−50	21	Relegation to Austrian Landesliga (Note: Bregenz were relegated to Austrian Landesliga, instead of Austrian First League because it went into administration.)

Source: weltfussball.de (in German)
Rules for classification: 1) points; 2) goal difference; 3) number of goals scored.
(C) Champions; (R) Relegated

== Results ==
Teams played each other four times in the league. In the first half of the season each team played every other team twice (home and away), and then did the same in the second half of the season.

=== First half of season ===
Home \ Away	ADM	ASZ	AWI	BRE	GAK	MAT	PAS	RWI	TIR	STU
Admira Wacker Mödling		0–2	0–5	3–0	2–0	3–1	2–4	1–0	0–2	0–0
Austria Salzburg	4–2		1–1	4–2	0–1	2–0	1–1	0–1	0–0	1–0
Austria Wien	2–1	2–0		2–0	0–0	2–0	1–2	1–1	2–2	3–0
Bregenz	1–1	1–1	0–9		1–3	2–1	2–3	1–5	3–2	2–1
Grazer AK	0–0	1–0	0–1	3–0		1–1	2–1	2–2	2–1	1–0
Mattersburg	3–0	5–3	0–0	5–2	0–1		3–0	0–0	2–1	1–1
Pasching	0–3	2–1	2–1	4–0	1–2	4–0		2–1	3–2	3–0
Rapid Wien	2–1	0–0	1–1	2–1	2–1	3–0	3–0		4–1	2–0
Wacker Tirol	0–2	3–1	0–2	1–1	1–0	5–1	2–1	0–2		2–1
Sturm Graz	1–0	3–1	0–2	0–0	1–0	3–1	1–2	0–1	3–1	

Source: weltfussball.de (in German)
Legend: Blue = home team win; Yellow = draw; Red = away team win.

=== Second half of season ===
Home \ Away	ADM	ASZ	AWI	BRE	GAK	MAT	PAS	RWI	TIR	STU
Admira Wacker Mödling		1–1	2–2	0–1	1–4	0–1	0–2	0–1	1–0	1–1
Austria Salzburg	0–1		0–1	2–1	0–1	1–2	0–1	4–1	1–1	1–0
Austria Wien	5–1	3–1		1–1	0–3 (Note: Match awarded.)	0–0	4–0	1–0	1–0	2–2
Bregenz	0–1	1–2	0–1		0–1	0–0	1–1	0–2	0–3	1–1
Grazer AK	5–2	1–0	0–0	2–0		5–1	1–2	3–1	2–1	4–0
Mattersburg	2–3	2–0	2–1	2–2	3–1		1–1	1–0	1–1	1–3
Pasching	1–1	1–1	1–1	2–0	0–3	1–0		1–1	1–1	2–1
Rapid Wien	6–0	5–0	0–1	4–1	1–0	2–1	2–1		2–2	4–1
Wacker Tirol	4–0	0–0	0–3	3–2	1–1	2–1	0–0	1–2		2–0
Sturm Graz	0–0	3–1	1–0	2–0	1–1	2–3	3–0	1–1	0–0	

Source: weltfussball.de (in German)
Legend: Blue = home team win; Yellow = draw; Red = away team win.

== Top goalscorers ==
Rank	Scorer	Club	Goals
1	(Austria) Christian Mayrleb	ASKÖ Pasching	21
2	(Norway) Sigurd Rushfeldt	Austria Wien	19
3	(Croatia) Mario Bazina	Grazer AK	15
3	(Austria) Roland Kollmann	Grazer AK	15
5	(Belgium) Axel Lawarée	Rapid Wien	13
6	(Austria) Wolfgang Mair	Wacker Tirol	12
6	(Netherlands) Samuel Koejoe	Wacker Tirol	12
8	(Austria) Ivica Vastić	Austria Wien	10
8	(Netherlands) Stefan Jansen	SW Bregenz	10

== Attendances ==
#	Club	Average
1	Rapid	14,718
2	Mattersburg	9,903
3	GAK	8,396
4	Salzburg	6,990
5	Sturm	6,739
6	Austria	6,131
7	Wacker	5,913
8	Pasching	3,881
9	Bregenz	3,028
10	Admira	1,870
