= František Cipro =

Czech footballer and manager (1947–2023)

Personal information
- Date of birth: 13 April 1947
- Place of birth: Jihlava, Czechoslovakia
- Date of death: 7 February 2023 (aged 75)
- Position: Midfielder

Youth career
- 1953–1966: České Budějovice

Senior career*
Years	Team	Apps	(Gls)
1966–1968	VTJ Tábor		
1968–1970	VCHZ Pardubice		
1970–1971	TJ Gottwaldov		
1971–1980	Slavia Prague	232	
1980–1982	TJ Jílové		
1984–1988	SV Gmünd		

Managerial career
- 1980–1982: TJ Jílové
- 1984–1988: SV Gmünd
- 1988–1990: Zbrojovka Brno
- 1990–1992: AEL Limassol
- 1992–1994: Chmel Blšany
- 1995–1997: Slavia Prague
- 1997–1999: Tirol Innsbruck
- 1999–2000: Slavia Prague
- 2001: LASK Linz
- 2001–2002: FK Teplice
- 2003–2004: Viktoria Plzeň
- 2004–2005: SV Freistadt
- 2005–2007: České Budějovice
- 2008–2009: SV Freistadt
- 2010: Slavia Prague
- 2011–2012: České Budějovice
- 2015: České Budějovice
- * Club domestic league appearances and goals

František Cipro (13 April 1947 – 7 February 2023) was a Czech football player and manager, known mostly for his work in Slavia Prague and České Budějovice.

== Playing career ==
A midfielder, Cipro played for Slavia Prague for nine years, making 232 league appearances. He made a total of 285 appearances and scored 16 goals in the Czechoslovak First League, which included time with VCHZ Pardubice and TJ Gottwaldov.

== Coaching career ==
As a coach, he won the Czech First League with Slavia Prague and achieved the semifinals of the UEFA Cup in 1996.

In his first spell as manager of České Budějovice, Cipro led the club to promotion from the Czech 2. Liga to the Czech First League in 2006. He was appointed a manager with Slavia Prague on 30 March 2010, replacing Karel Jarolím. However, on 15 May 2010, following the last league game of the season, Cipro announced he was standing down from the position and returning to his role as chief scout, after just eight league games in charge.

Cipro returned to České Budějovice for his second spell in September 2011. He stayed at České Budějovice for a year before he was sacked in September 2012, with the club at the bottom of the league table.

== Death ==
Cipro died from colon cancer on 7 February 2023, at the age of 75.
