= Heinz Weber =

Austrian footballer (born 1976)

Personal information
- Date of birth: 5 December 1976 (age 49)
- Place of birth: Vienna, Austria
- Height: 1.88 m (6 ft 2 in)
- Position: Goalkeeper

Senior career*
Years	Team	Apps	(Gls)
1994–1997	First Vienna FC	24	(0)
1997–2002	Wacker Innsbruck	9	(0)
2000–2001	→ FC St. Pauli (loan)	32	(0)
2002–2003	Sturm Graz	26	(0)
2003–2004	Untersiebenbrunn	24	(0)
2004–2005	Kremser SC	24	(0)
2005–2008	FC Gratkorn	86	(0)
2008–2010	Austria Kärnten	14	(0)
2010–2011	Austria Klagenfurt	4	(0)
Total		243	(0)
- * Club domestic league appearances and goals

Heinz Weber (born 5 December 1976) is an Austrian former professional footballer who played as a goalkeeper.
