= FC Waidhofen/Ybbs =

Association football club in Waidhofen an der Ybbs, Austria

- Full name: Fußball Club Waidhofen an der Ybbs
- Founded: 1973; 53 years ago
- Dissolved: 2011
- Ground: Alpenstadion, Waidhofen an der Ybbs
- Capacity: 3,000
- Final season; 2010–11: 11th of 16 in Regionalliga East
Home colours	Away colours

FC Waidhofen/Ybbs was an Austrian football club from Waidhofen an der Ybbs in Lower Austria. It was formed in 1973 by a merger of two local clubs and played at the Alpenstadion.

The club spent most of its later history in the Regionalliga East, the third tier of Austrian football. It won the division in the 2009–10 season under Ivica Vastić, the greatest success in its history. The club declined promotion to the second tier for financial reasons.

FC Waidhofen/Ybbs withdrew from the Regionalliga East in the summer of 2011. Football in the town has since been played by SG Waidhofen/Ybbs, a joint team that uses the same ground.

== History ==
=== Foundation ===
The club was formed in 1973 by a merger of 1. Waidhofner Sportklub and Union Waidhofen. Union Waidhofen was the football section of SPORTUNION Waidhofen, which had been founded on 8 August 1945 and had added football in 1953. SPORTUNION Waidhofen gives the year of the merger as 1974.

=== Rise to the Regionalliga ===
Waidhofen won the 1. Niederösterreichische Landesliga in 1976 and was promoted to the Regionalliga East. The club held its place until the division was suspended at the end of the 1979–80 season.

The Regionalliga East was reintroduced in 1985. Waidhofen won a second 1. Niederösterreichische Landesliga title in 1993 and returned to the division. It played there in every season from 1993–94 onwards. The club finished second behind Parndorf in the 2003–04 season.

=== Vastić and the 2010 title ===
FC Waidhofen/Ybbs presented Ivica Vastić as its coach on 19 June 2009 at a press conference in Gaflenz, the seat of the main sponsor Harreither. Vastić had ended his playing career at LASK and signed a two-year contract. He described the club as an ideal place to gain his first coaching experience. Vastić succeeded Heinz Thonhofer, who had been released after receiving an offer from a Bundesliga club.

LASK was the club's cooperation partner, and Vastić said he wanted players to step up to the Linz club. Several LASK players moved to Waidhofen to train under him. Sponsor Raimund Harreither said the partnership suited the club's plan to develop young players from the region. Vastić also worked as a trainer and lecturer at the sponsor's in-house academy for about twenty days a year.

Waidhofen won the Regionalliga East in the 2009–10 season. It was the greatest success in the club's history. The club did not take up promotion to the second tier for financial reasons.

=== Withdrawal ===
Waidhofen finished eleventh of sixteen in the Regionalliga East in the 2010–11 season. The club withdrew from the division in the summer of 2011 for financial reasons. The entire squad left and the club came close to dissolution.

SC Waidhofen was founded as a new club and immediately formed a Spielgemeinschaft with FC Waidhofen. The combined side entered the 2. Klasse Ybbstal, the lowest level of the Lower Austrian league system.

== Successor ==
SG Waidhofen/Ybbs has since climbed back through the Lower Austrian divisions. The side won the Gebietsliga West in June 2026 and was promoted to the 2. Landesliga West. Niko Saric was appointed coach for the 2026–27 season. The team plays its home matches at the Alpenstadion.

== Ground ==
FC Waidhofen/Ybbs played at the Alpenstadion on Hötzendorfstraße in Waidhofen an der Ybbs. The ground has a grass pitch, floodlights and a running track. SG Waidhofen/Ybbs uses the same stadium.

== Honours ==
- Regionalliga Ost
  - Winners: 2009–10
- Lower Austrian Landesliga
  - Winners: 1976, 1993
