= Christian Mayrleb =

Austrian footballer (born 1972)

Personal information
- Date of birth: 8 June 1972 (age 54)
- Place of birth: Wels, Austria
- Height: 1.76 m (5 ft 9 in)
- Position: Striker

Team information
- Current team: ASKÖ Donau Linz (Manager)

Youth career
- 1981–1991: SK VOEST Linz

Senior career*
Years	Team	Apps	(Gls)
1992–1993	Stahl Linz	2	(0)
1993–1994	SV Ried	76	(35)
1994–1996	Admira/Wacker	66	(15)
1996–1997	FC Tirol Innsbruck	53	(17)
1998	Sheffield Wednesday	3	(0)
1998–2002	Austria Vienna	134	(65)
2003–2005	SV Pasching	75	(38)
2005–2006	Red Bull Salzburg	28	(7)
2006–2007	SV Pasching	30	(11)
2007–2010	LASK Linz	108	(33)
2011	FC Pasching	9	(3)
Total		584	(224)

International career
1998–2005	Austria	30	(6)

Managerial career
- 2012: ATSV Stadl-Paura (sporting director)
- 2012–2016: ATSV Stadl-Paura
- 2016–2018: ASKÖ Oedt
- 2019–: ASKÖ Donau Linz
- * Club domestic league appearances and goals

Christian Mayrleb (born 8 June 1972) is an Austrian retired professional footballer who is employed as the manager of Austrian side ASKÖ Donau Linz.

== Club career ==
Born in Wels, Upper Austria, Mayrleb started his professional career at Second Division side Stahl Linz and SV Ried before joining Austrian Bundesliga outfit Admira/Wacker at the start of the 1994–95 season. He then played for FC Tirol Innsbruck where he was snapped up by English Premier League club Sheffield Wednesday, only to return to Austria after half a season on the subs' bench.

He moved to Vienna club Austria Vienna for a prolific four years before moving on to play for SV Pasching, Red Bull Salzburg and ending up in Linz again with LASK Linz.

In November 2006 Mayrleb failed a drug test but was cleared by a League disciplinary panel because no evidence was found he was taking performance-enhancing drugs.

== International career ==
Mayrleb made his debut for the Austria national team in an August 1998 friendly match against France and came on as a substitute in his first six matches for the national team. He scored his first goal two months after his debut game. He earned 29 caps, scoring six goals. His last international was a September 2005 World Cup qualification match against Azerbaijan.

== Honours ==
Individual

- Austrian Bundesliga top scorer: 2004–05
