= Gernot Krinner =

Austrian footballer

Personal information
- Date of birth: 1 April 1967 (age 59)
- Place of birth: Maria Lankowitz
- Position: Forward

Senior career*
Years	Team	Apps	(Gls)
1987–1988	ASK Köflach		
1988–1990	Grazer AK		
1990–1995	SK Vorwärts Steyr		
1996–1997	FC Tirol Innsbruck		
1997–1999	FK Austria Wien		
2000–2002	SK Eintracht Wels		

Managerial career
- 2005–2006: FC Zeltweg
- 2018–?: SV Kaindorf
- * Club domestic league appearances and goals

Gernot Krinner (born 1 April 1967) is a retired Austrian football striker.
