= Ivica Vastić =

Austrian footballer (born 1969)

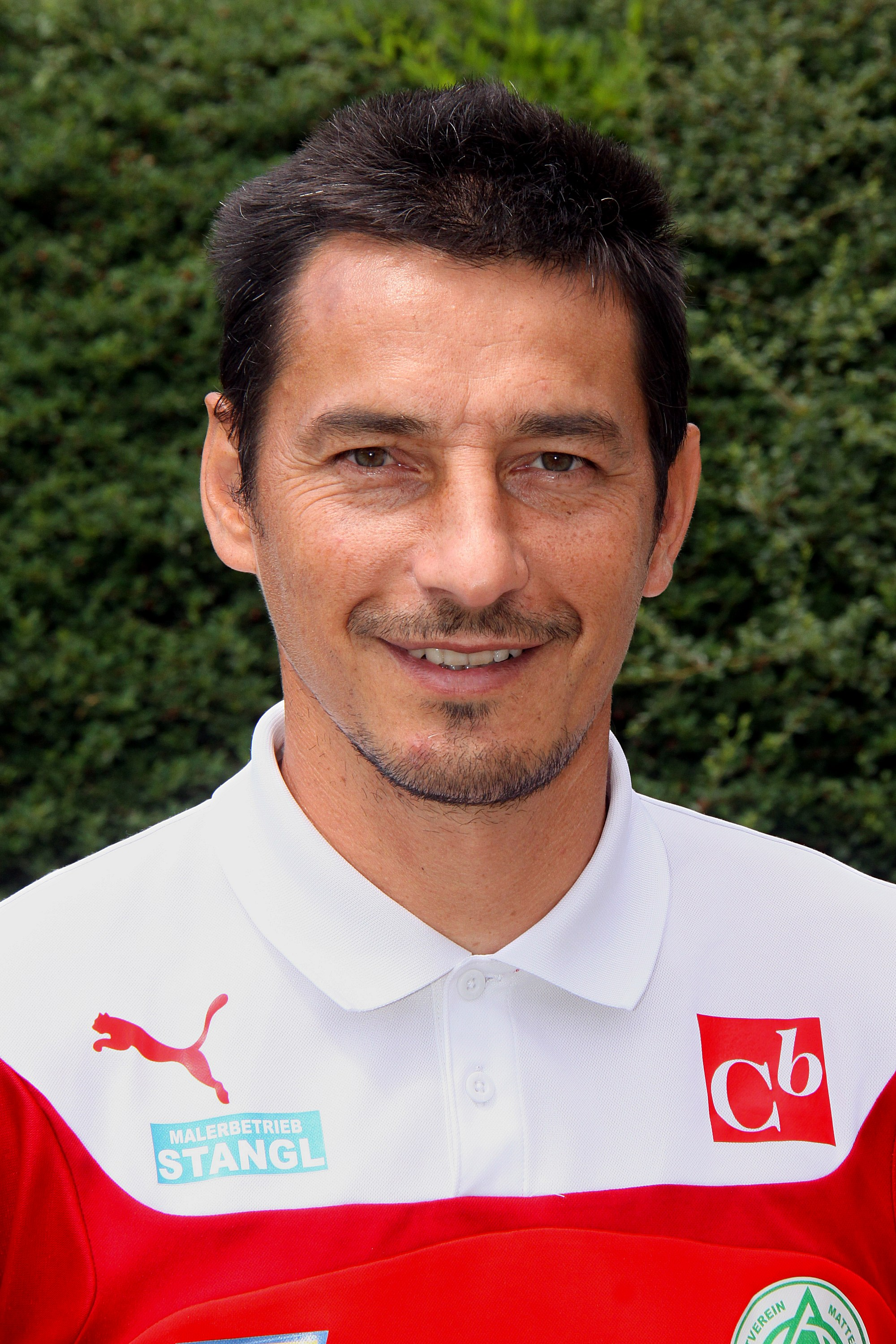
- Vastić in 2015

Personal information
- Date of birth: 29 September 1969 (age 57)
- Place of birth: Split, SR Croatia, SFR Yugoslavia
- Height: 1.83 m (6 ft 0 in)
- Positions: Midfielder; striker

Team information
- Current team: HNK Šibenik U19 (Head coach)

Youth career
- NK GOŠK Kaštel Gomilica

Senior career*
Years	Team	Apps	(Gls)
1989–1991	RNK Split	22	(5)
1991–1992	First Vienna FC	23	(8)
1992–1993	VSE St. Pölten	34	(18)
1993	Admira Wacker Mödling	18	(7)
1994	MSV Duisburg	10	(0)
1994–2002	Sturm Graz	250	(125)
2002–2003	Nagoya Grampus Eight	27	(13)
2003–2005	Austria Wien	67	(14)
2005–2009	LASK	123	(59)
Total		574	(249)

International career
1996–2008	Austria	50	(14)

Managerial career
- 2009–2010: FC Waidhofen/Ybbs
- 2010–2011: Austria Wien Amateure
- 2011–2012: Austria Wien
- 2012–2013: SV Gaflenz (assistant)
- 2013: SV Gaflenz
- 2013–2017: SV Mattersburg
- 2018–2020: Austria Wien U16
- 2020–2024: Austria Wien U18 (coach)
- 2024–: HNK Šibenik U19
- * Club domestic league appearances and goals

Ivica Vastić (German pronunciation: [iˈvɪtsa ˈvastɪtʃ]; born 29 September 1969) is a retired professional footballer, who played as a midfielder and as a striker. He is currently the youth head coach of HNK Šibenik U19.

Born in Croatia, Vastić represented Austria national football team at the 1998 FIFA World Cup and UEFA Euro 2008. At the club level, he played for football clubs in Croatia, Austria, and Japan.

== Club career ==
Born in Split, SR Croatia, then still part of Yugoslavia, Vastić started to play for the local club Jugovinil (today GOŠK Adriachem), before joining RNK Split at the time playing in the Yugoslav third level. In 1991, he moved to Austria and signed with First Vienna FC. He subsequently also played for other Austrian clubs, such as VSE St. Pölten and Admira Wacker Mödling, and also had a half-season spell with Bundesliga side MSV Duisburg, where he made 10 league appearances without scoring a goal.

=== Sturm Graz ===
Vastić's most notable spell was with Sturm Graz between 1994 and 2002, during which he helped the club win the Austrian Bundesliga two consecutive times in 1998 and 1999, as well as the Austrian Cup in 1996, 1997 and 1999. With the club, he also played in the group stages of the UEFA Champions League in the 1998/1999 and 1999/2000 seasons of the competition.

=== Japan and return to Austria ===
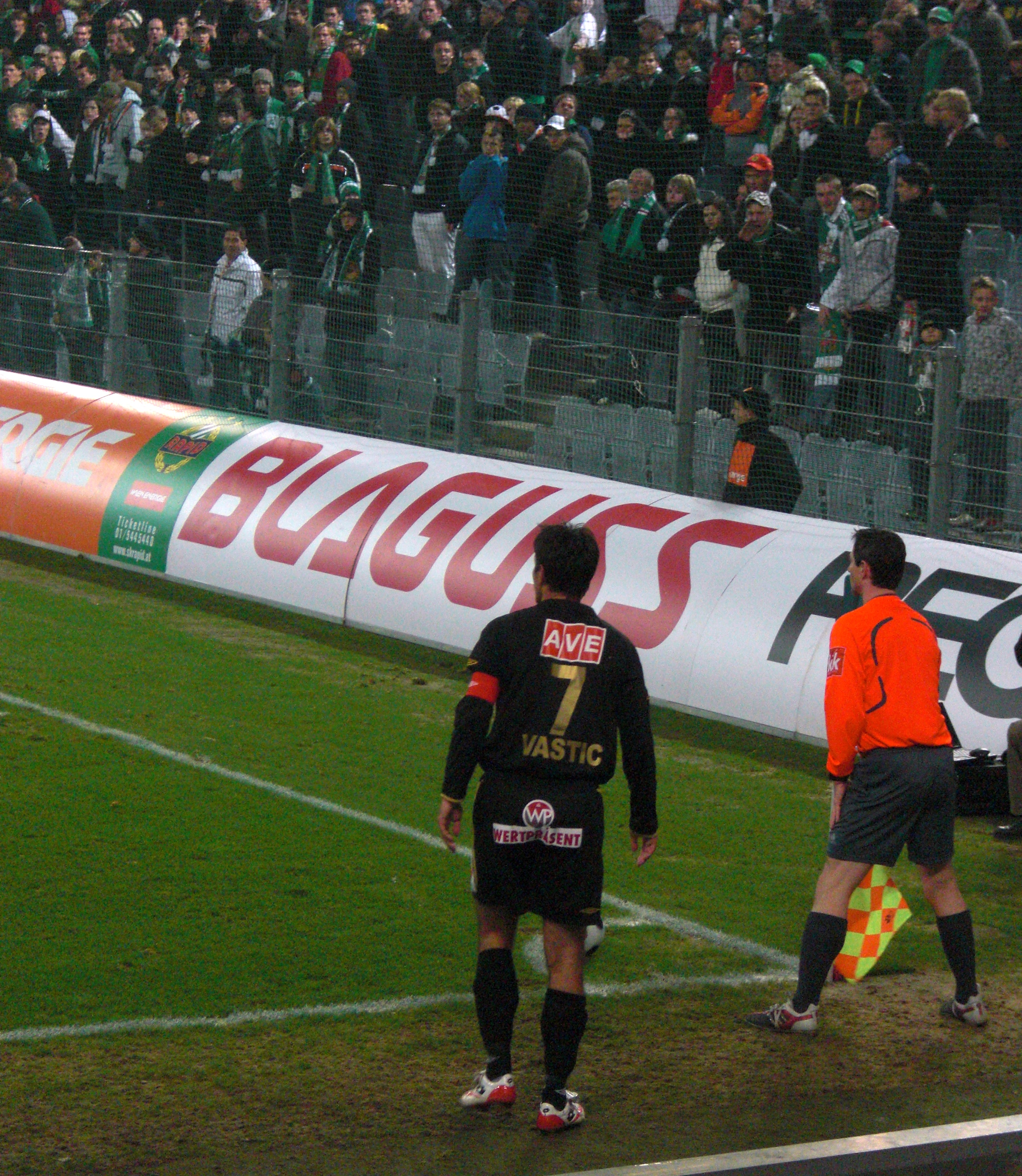
Vastić playing for LASK

Vastić left Sturm for a one-season spell with Japanese club Nagoya Grampus Eight, after which he returned to Austria to spend two seasons with Austria Vienna before joining LASK in the summer of 2005. He performed well for LASK in the Erste Liga, the Austrian second division, and was the top goalscorer of the league in two consecutive seasons, scoring a total of 42 goals in 62 league appearances between 2005 and 2007. After helping LASK win promotion to the Austrian Bundesliga in 2007, he went on to help the club finish sixth in the 2007/2008 Austrian Bundesliga season and himself finished the season as the club's top goalscorer in the league, having netted 13 goals in 32 appearances. Vastić announced his retirement on 18 May 2009, quitting professional football by 30 June 2009.

== International career ==
Vastić became an Austrian national in 1996 and subsequently started to play for the Austria national football team. By 2005, Vastić had won a total of 46 caps and scored 12 goals as an Austrian international. He then disappeared from the team for a period before making a spectacular comeback in 2008, being a surprise selection in the Euro 2008 squad and scoring Austria's first ever goal in the European Championship, also becoming the oldest goalscorer in the history of the tournament until Luka Modrić broke the record in Euro 2024.

=== 1998 World Cup ===
Vastić's first appearance at a major tournament with Austria was at the 1998 FIFA World Cup finals in France, where he appeared in all of the team's three group matches and scored a last-minute equaliser in their second match at the tournament, a 1–1 draw against Chile. The Austrians were, however, eliminated from the tournament in the first round after recording two draws and one defeat.

=== Euro 2008 ===
On 24 April 2008, Vastić was surprisingly added to Austria's preliminary squad for the UEFA Euro 2008 finals co-hosted by Austria and Switzerland in June. His last appearance for the national team prior to the call-up had been more than two and a half years before, on 17 August 2005 in their 2–2 draw in a friendly match against Scotland. He then made his international comeback, winning his 47th cap, as a substitute in Austria's friendly match against Nigeria on 27 May 2008 and was eventually added to their final 23-man squad for the Euro 2008 finals, where he was the oldest player. In Austria's next friendly match three days later, he scored the team's fourth goal in their 5–1 victory over Malta.

On 8 June, Vastić made his Euro 2008 bow in the 1–0 defeat to his native Croatia, replacing Jürgen Säumel in the 61st minute.

On 12 June, Vastić appeared in Austria's second match of the tournament, a 1–1 draw with Poland, winning his 50th international cap as he replaced captain Andreas Ivanschitz in the 64th minute. In the match, he scored Austria's first goal in the UEFA European Championship final tournaments by netting an injury-time penalty to equalise, also becoming the oldest goalscorer of the European Championship finals at age 38 years, 257 days, over four years older than Nené who held the record since 1984. This record was broken by Luka Modrić in Euro 2024.

== Coaching career ==
=== FC Waidhofen/Ybbs ===
On 16 June 2009, Vastić was named head coach of FC Waidhofen/Ybbs of the Regionalliga Ost. Coincidently the club began a cooperation with the former Vastic club LASK. He started his coaching career very well, winning the Regionalliga Ost in 2009/10.

=== Austria Wien ===
Vastić changed to Austria Wien Amateurs in summer 2010 and was promoted to manager of the first team of Austria Wien in December 2011. He was sacked on 21 May 2012, and his contract was not renewed when it finished at the end of May.

=== SV Mattersburg ===
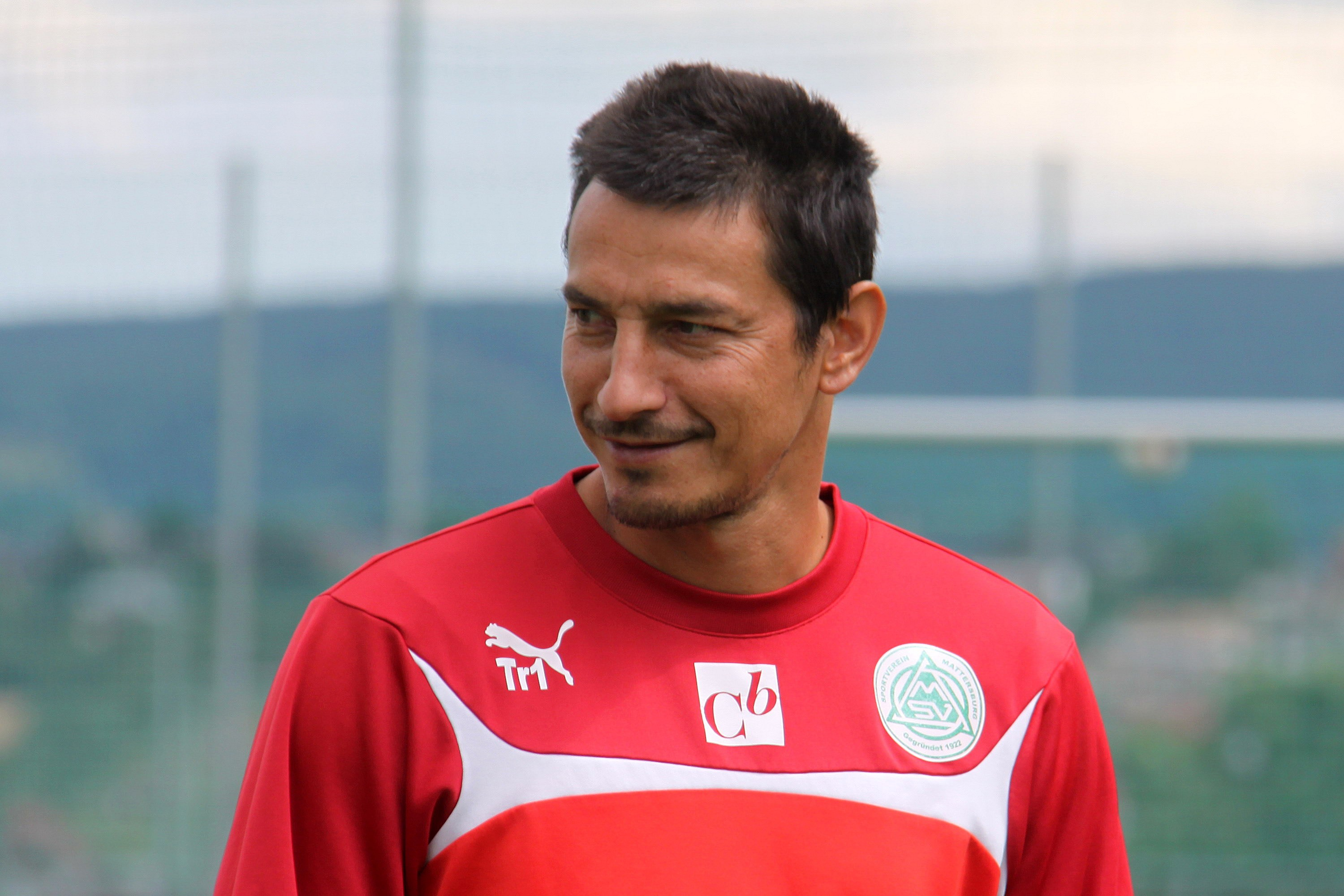
Vastić as SV Mattersburg head coach in 2015.

Vastić became head coach on 20 December 2013. He is signed to the end of the season with an option for two more years. He subsequently had his option picked up. On 23 April 2016, Austria Wien defeated SV Mattersburg 9–0.

== Personal life ==
Vastić has been married to his wife Annie for more than 20 years. Together, they have three children. His oldest son Toni also became a professional footballer and is signed to German Regionalliga side VfR Aalen.

== Career statistics ==
=== Club ===
Appearances and goals by club, season and competition
Club	Season	League			Cup		Continental		Total	
Club	Season	Division	Apps	Goals	Apps	Goals	Apps	Goals	Apps	Goals
RNK Split	1990–91	Yugoslav Third League	22	5			–		22	5
First Vienna FC	1991–92	Austrian Bundesliga	23	8	2	1	–		25	9
VSE St. Pölten	1992–93	Austrian Bundesliga	34	18	3	3	–		37	21
Admira Wacker	1993–94	Austrian Bundesliga	18	7	2	1	2	0	22	8
MSV Duisburg	1993–94	Bundesliga	10	0	0	0	–		10	0
Sturm Graz	1994–95	Austrian Bundesliga	35	7	0	0	–		35	7
Sturm Graz	1995–96	Austrian Bundesliga	31	20	5	2	2	0	38	22
Sturm Graz	1996–97	Austrian Bundesliga	33	13	4	4	2	1	39	18
Sturm Graz	1997–98	Austrian Bundesliga	30	14	6	3	4	1	40	18
Sturm Graz	1998–99	Austrian Bundesliga	30	14	5	3	7	3	42	20
Sturm Graz	1999–2000	Austrian Bundesliga	35	32	3	3	10	4	48	39
Sturm Graz	2000–01	Austrian Bundesliga	24	8	1	0	10	1	35	9
Sturm Graz	2001–02	Austrian Bundesliga	32	17	4	2	2	1	38	20
Sturm Graz	Total		250	125	28	17	37	11	315	153
Nagoya Grampus Eight	2002	J1 League	18	10	3	0	–		21	10
Nagoya Grampus Eight	2003	J1 League	9	3	1	0	–		10	3
Nagoya Grampus Eight	Total		27	13	4	0	0	0	31	13
Austria Wien	2003–04	Austrian Bundesliga	35	4	3	2	3	0	41	6
Austria Wien	2004–05	Austrian Bundesliga	32	10	5	4	14	2	51	16
Austria Wien	Total		67	14	8	6	17	2	92	22
LASK	2005–06	Austrian First League	31	19	1	0	–		32	19
LASK	2006–07	Austrian First League	31	23	3	0	–		34	23
LASK	2007–08	Austrian Bundesliga	32	13	0	0	–		32	13
LASK	2008–09	Austrian Bundesliga	29	4	2	1	–		31	5
LASK	Total		123	59	6	1	0	0	129	60
Career total			574	249	53	29	56	13	683	291

=== International ===
Appearances and goals by national team and year
National team	Year	Apps	Goals
Austria	1996	3	0
Austria	1997	6	1
Austria	1998	11	4
Austria	1999	5	4
Austria	2000	3	2
Austria	2001	9	0
Austria	2002	3	0
Austria	2003	0	0
Austria	2004	2	0
Austria	2005	4	1
Austria	2006	0	0
Austria	2007	0	0
Austria	2008	4	2
Total		50	14

Scores and results list Austria's goal tally first, score column indicates score after each Vastić goal.

List of international goals scored by Ivica Vastić
No.	Date	Venue	Opponent	Score	Result	Competition	Ref.
1	30 April 1997	Ernst-Happel-Stadion, Vienna, Austria	Estonia	1-0	2-0	1998 FIFA World Cup qualification	
2	25 March 1998	Ernst-Happel-Stadion, Vienna, Austria	Hungary	1-1	2-3	Friendly	
3	17 June 1998	Stade Geoffroy-Guichard, Saint-Étienne, France	Chile	1-1	1-1	1998 FIFA World Cup	
4	19 August 1998	Ernst-Happel-Stadion, Vienna, Austria	France	2-1	2-2	Friendly	
5	14 October 1998	San Marino Stadium, Serravalle, San Marino	San Marino	1-0	4-1	UEFA Euro 2000 qualification	
6	28 April 1999	Arnold Schwarzenegger-Stadion, Graz, Austria	San Marino	2-0	7-0	UEFA Euro 2000 qualification	
7	28 April 1999	Arnold Schwarzenegger-Stadion, Graz, Austria	San Marino	3-0	7-0	UEFA Euro 2000 qualification	
8	28 April 1999	Arnold Schwarzenegger-Stadion, Graz, Austria	San Marino	7-0	7-0	UEFA Euro 2000 qualification	
9	10 October 1999	Ernst-Happel-Stadion, Vienna, Austria	Cyprus	2-0	3-1	UEFA Euro 2000 qualification	
10	23 February 2000	Messiniakos Stadium, Kalamata, Greece	Greece	1-1	1-4	Friendly	
11	26 April 2000	Ernst-Happel-Stadion, Vienna, Austria	Croatia	1-0	1-2	Friendly	
12	26 March 2005	Millennium Stadium, Cardiff, Wales	Wales	1-0	2-0	2006 FIFA World Cup qualification	
13	30 May 2008	UPC-Arena, Graz, Austria	Malta	4-1	5-1	Friendly	
14	12 June 2008	Ernst-Happel-Stadion, Vienna, Austria	Poland	1-1	1-1	UEFA Euro 2008	

=== Coaching record ===
As of 25 May 2017

Team	From	To	Record							
Team	From	To	G	W	D	L	GF	GA	GD	Win %
Waidhofen/Ybbs	16 June 2009	30 June 2010	30	17	7	6	57	31	+26	56.67
Austria Wien II	1 July 2010	21 December 2011	49	24	11	14	89	57	+32	48.98
Austria Wien	21 December 2011	31 May 2012	19	8	5	6	20	17	+3	42.11
Gaflenz	27 May 2013	20 December 2013	18	10	3	5	34	21	+13	55.56
Mattersburg	20 December 2013	2 January 2017	118	45	30	43	181	183	−2	38.14
Total			234	104	55	75	384	313	+71	44.44

== Honours ==
=== Player ===
Sturm Graz

- Austrian Bundesliga: 1997–98, 1998–99
- Austrian Cup: 1995–96, 1996–97, 1998–99
- Austrian Supercup: 1996, 1998, 1999

Austria Wien

- Austrian Cup: 2004–05; runner-up: 2003–04

LASK

- Austrian Football First League: 2006–07

Individual

- Austrian Footballer of the Year: 1995, 1998, 1999, 2007
- Austrian Bundesliga Top Scorer: 1995–96, 1999–2000
- Austrian Football First League Top Scorer: 2005–06, 2006–07

=== Manager ===
FC Waidhofen/Ybbs

- Regionalliga Ost: 2009–10

SV Mattersburg

- Austrian Football First League: 2014–15
