= 1999–2000 Austrian Football Bundesliga =

82nd season of top-tier football league in Austria

Austrian Bundesliga
- Season: 1999–2000
- Champions: FC Tirol Innsbruck

This page details the statistics of Austrian Football Bundesliga in the 1999–2000 season.

== Overview ==
It was contested by 10 teams, and FC Tirol Innsbruck won the championship.

=== Teams and location ===
Location of teams in the 1999–2000 Austrian Football Bundesliga

Teams of 1999-2000 Austrian Football Bundesliga

- Austria Lustenau
- Austria Salzburg
- Austria Wien
- Bregenz
- Grazer AK
- LASK
- Rapid Wien
- SV Ried
- Sturm Graz
- Tirol Innsbruck

== League standings ==
Pos	Team	Pld	W	D	L	GF	GA	GD	Pts	Qualification or relegation
1	Tirol Innsbruck (C)	36	24	5	7	54	30	+24	77	Qualification to Champions League third qualifying round
2	Sturm Graz	36	22	8	6	77	32	+45	74	Qualification to Champions League second qualifying round
3	Rapid Wien	36	20	6	10	59	29	+30	66	Qualification to UEFA Cup qualifying round
4	Austria Wien	36	16	6	14	49	44	+5	54	
5	Ried	36	15	8	13	56	39	+17	53	
6	Austria Salzburg	36	12	10	14	39	45	−6	46	Qualification to Intertoto Cup second round
7	Grazer AK	36	12	6	18	41	62	−21	42	Qualification to UEFA Cup first round
8	LASK Linz	36	10	9	17	41	49	−8	39	Qualification to Intertoto Cup first round
9	Bregenz	36	10	5	21	39	73	−34	35	
10	Austria Lustenau (R)	36	4	7	25	22	74	−52	19	Relegation to Austrian First Football League

Source: weltfussball.de (in German)
Rules for classification: 1) points; 2) goal difference; 3) number of goals scored.
(C) Champions; (R) Relegated

== Results ==
Teams played each other four times in the league. In the first half of the season each team played every other team twice (home and away), and then did the same in the second half of the season.

=== First half of season ===
Home \ Away	ALU	ASZ	AUS	BRE	GAK	LIN	RWI	RIE	STU	TIR
Austria Lustenau		1–0	1–0	3–0	1–4	1–1	0–1	0–1	1–2	1–3
Austria Salzburg	1–0		0–1	0–1	1–0	2–1	1–1	2–2	1–1	1–0
Austria Wien	2–0	2–0		3–1	5–2	2–1	0–3	0–2	1–3	0–2
Bregenz	2–0	0–0	1–1		0–1	2–1	1–1	1–2	1–4	0–3
Grazer AK	2–3	0–0	0–2	3–0		0–1	3–1	0–0	1–0	1–1
LASK Linz	3–0	2–4	1–1	3–0	1–3		0–1	1–0	0–2	3–0
Rapid Wien	2–0	1–0	2–0	2–0	2–1	3–0		5–1	0–0	2–4
Ried	1–1	3–0	0–0	5–1	0–1	2–1	1–2		2–0	5–0
Sturm Graz	5–1	0–2	2–2	4–0	5–0	0–0	1–0	2–1		0–1
Tirol Innsbruck	3–0	0–0	0–2	4–0	1–0	5–0	2–1	1–0	1–0	

Source: weltfussball.de (in German)
Legend: Blue = home team win; Yellow = draw; Red = away team win.

=== Second half of season ===
Home \ Away	ALU	ASZ	AUS	BRE	GAK	LIN	RWI	RIE	STU	TIR
Austria Lustenau		0–2	1–2	0–4	0–0	2–2	0–1	1–1	0–1	1–1
Austria Salzburg	2–0		2–1	4–1	5–1	1–2	0–0	2–1	0–0	0–1
Austria Wien	1–0	2–2		2–5	2–0	3–1	3–0	1–0	0–1	2–0
Bregenz	1–1	5–1	1–1		3–1	0–2	0–3	0–4	1–0	0–3
Grazer AK	2–0	2–0	2–0	0–4		2–1	0–4	1–1	2–4	2–0
LASK Linz	5–0	1–1	1–0	0–1	2–2		1–1	1–1	1–1	0–1
Rapid Wien	4–0	5–0	1–0	4–1	2–0	0–1		1–0	2–3	0–0
Ried	4–2	2–0	1–2	2–0	3–1	2–0	1–0		1–1	1–2
Sturm Graz	7–0	3–1	3–2	3–1	6–1	2–0	3–1	3–2		4–1
Tirol Innsbruck	1–0	2–1	2–1	2–0	1–0	1–0	1–0	3–1	1–1	

Source: weltfussball.de (in German)
Legend: Blue = home team win; Yellow = draw; Red = away team win.

== Top goalscorers ==
Rank	Scorer	Club	Goals
1	(Austria) Ivica Vastić	Sturm Graz	32
2	(Austria) Christian Mayrleb	Austria Wien	21
3	(Austria) Ronald Brunmayr	SV Ried	19
4	(Poland) Radosław Gilewicz	Tirol Innsbruck	18
5	(Czech Republic) René Wagner	Rapid Wien	17
6	(Nigeria) Benedict Akwuegbu	Grazer AK	12
7	(Slovenia) Sašo Udovič	LASK Linz	11
7	(Federal Republic of Yugoslavia) Dejan Savićević	Rapid Wien	11
9	(Netherlands) Erik Regtop	SW Bregenz/Austria Lustenau	10
9	(Austria) Zeljko Radovic	Rapid Wien/Grazer AK	10

== Attendances ==
#	Club	Average
1	Tirol	11,404
2	Rapid	11,389
3	Sturm	11,123
4	Salzburg	6,811
5	Lustenau	6,733
6	GAK	6,584
7	LASK	6,306
8	Austria	5,810
9	Bregenz	5,540
10	Ried	5,324
