= ASKÖ Pasching =

Austrian football club, based in Pasching

- Full name: ASKÖ Pasching
- Nickname: Schwarz-Grün (The Black-Greens)
- Founded: 28 May 1946
- Dissolved: 1 June 2007
- Ground: Waldstadion, Pasching
- Capacity: 7,152
- League: Austrian Football Bundesliga
- 2006–07: 5th
Home colours	Away colours

ASKÖ Pasching was an Austrian football club based in Pasching, Upper Austria. The club in its later stages was also known under the sponsorship derived names SV PlusCity Pasching and, from 2003 until its end, FC Superfund. It is a precursor of SK Austria Kärnten from which the current FC Pasching, Austrian Cup winner of 2013, originated.

== History ==
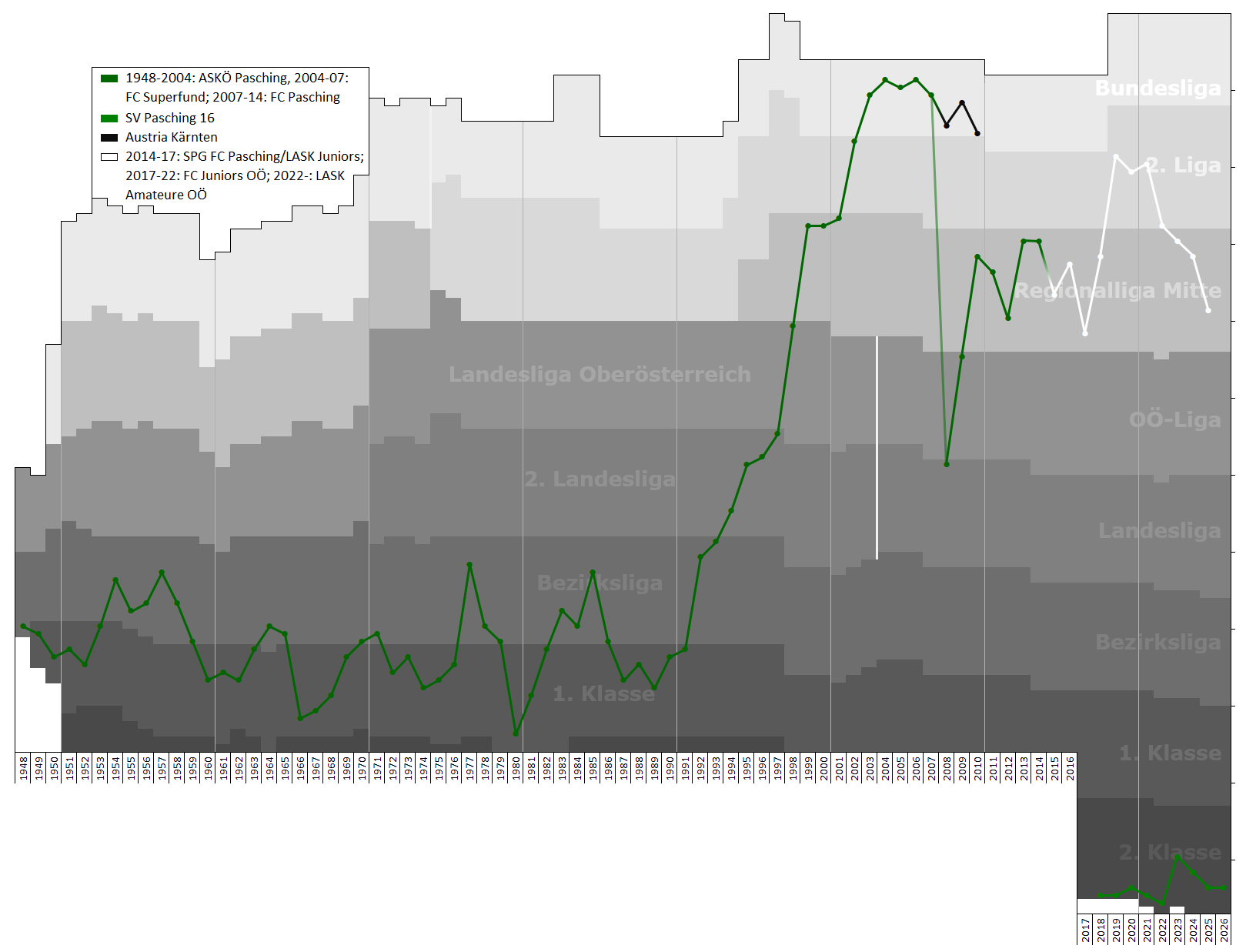
Historical chart of Pasching league performance

The club was formed on 15 June 1946 as ATSV Pasching, renaming to ASKÖ Pasching in 1986. ASKÖ denotes membership in the Arbeitsgemeinschaft für Sport und Körperkultur in Österreich, an organisation that has its origins in the labour movement and is associated with the Social Democratic Party of Austria. The club was the second Austrian club to achieve promotion from the 4th division of the Austrian League to the 1st division in consecutive seasons.

The club' most notable achievement in European football occurred in the 2003/04 season, when they knocked German team Werder Bremen out of the UEFA Intertoto Cup with an aggregate score of 5:1 (first leg 4–0, second leg 1–1), and went on to reach the final. At the end of the 2003/04 season, ASKÖ Pasching qualified directly for the UEFA Cup for the first time in its history. The club has participated in the Austrian Bundesliga from 2002 until 2007. During these five years the club was known as SV PlusCity and FC Superfund due to sponsorship reasons.

After the insolvence of the club in 2007, the newly founded club of SK Austria Kärnten in Klagenfurt, the capital of the state of Carinthia, took over the first division licence of Pasching. In turn, Austria Kärnten mutated after its own demise in 2010 into FC Pasching.

== European cup history ==
- Q = Qualifying

Season	Competition	Round	Country	Club	Home	Away	Aggregate
2003	UEFA Intertoto Cup	R1	(Georgia (country))	WIT Georgia	1–0	1–2	2–2
2003	UEFA Intertoto Cup	R2	(North Macedonia)	FK Pobeda	2–1	1–1	3–2
2003	UEFA Intertoto Cup	R3	(Kazakhstan)	Tobol Kostanay	3–0	1–0	4–0
2003	UEFA Intertoto Cup	Semifinals	(Germany)	Werder Bremen	4–0	1–1	5–1
2003	UEFA Intertoto Cup	Finals	(Germany)	FC Schalke 04	0–2	0–0	0–2
2004/05	UEFA Cup	Q2	(Russia)	Zenit St. Petersburg	3–1	0–2	3–3
2005/06	UEFA Cup	Q2	(Russia)	Zenit St. Petersburg	2–2	1–1	3–3
2006/07	UEFA Cup	1	(Italy)	Livorno	0–1	0–2	0–3
