= 2001–02 Austrian Football Bundesliga =

84th season of top-tier football league in Austria

Austrian Bundesliga
- Season: 2001–02
- Champions: FC Tirol Innsbruck

Statistics of Austrian Football Bundesliga in the 2001–02 season.

== Overview ==
It was contested by 10 teams, and FC Tirol Innsbruck won the championship.

=== Teams and location ===
Location of teams in the 2001–02 Austrian Football Bundesliga

Teams of 2001-02 Austrian Football Bundesliga

- FC Admira/Wacker
- Austria Salzburg
- Austria Wien
- Bregenz
- Grazer AK
- Kärnten
- LASK
- Rapid Wien
- SV Ried
- Sturm Graz
- Tirol Innsbruck

== League standings ==
Pos	Team	Pld	W	D	L	GF	GA	GD	Pts	Qualification or relegation
1	Tirol Innsbruck (C, R)	36	23	6	7	63	20	+43	75	Relegation to Austrian West League (Note: Tirol Innsbruck did not receive a licence for the next season and were excluded from Austrian Bundesliga. Subsequently, they were excluded from the Champions League, while Bundesliga runners-up Sturm Graz were moved from Second to Third qualifying round and 3rd-placed team Grazer AK replaced Sturm in the Second qualifying round.)
2	Sturm Graz	36	18	11	7	68	42	+26	65	Qualification to Champions League third qualifying round
3	Grazer AK	36	17	12	7	69	39	+30	63	Qualification to Champions League second qualifying round
4	Austria Wien	36	14	11	11	53	38	+15	53	Qualification to UEFA Cup first round
5	Kärnten	36	14	8	14	40	52	−12	50	Qualification to UEFA Cup qualifying round
6	Austria Salzburg	36	13	10	13	42	40	+2	49	
7	Bregenz	36	12	9	15	51	70	−19	45	Qualification to Intertoto Cup second round
8	Rapid Wien	36	11	10	15	37	49	−12	43	
9	Ried	36	9	9	18	37	54	−17	36	
10	Admira Wacker Mödling	36	3	6	27	25	81	−56	15	

Source: weltfussball.de (in German)
Rules for classification: 1) points; 2) goal difference; 3) number of goals scored.
(C) Champions; (R) Relegated

== Results ==
Teams played each other four times in the league. In the first half of the season each team played every other team twice (home and away), and then did the same in the second half of the season.

=== First half of season ===
Home \ Away	ADM	ASZ	AWI	BRE	GAK	KÄR	RIE	RWI	STU	TIR
Admira Wacker Mödling		1–2	2–4	1–3	1–3	0–1	0–2	0–0	1–2	0–2
Austria Salzburg	2–0		0–0	3–3	2–1	1–2	2–0	0–1	0–2	0–0
Austria Wien	3–0	0–1		1–0	2–3	2–0	3–3	2–1	1–1	0–1
Bregenz	1–0	2–2	2–2		2–2	2–0	0–3	2–1	0–5	1–2
Grazer AK	3–0	1–1	4–2	0–0		5–0	3–0	1–0	1–1	0–2
Kärnten	2–0	1–1	0–0	1–1	3–2		1–2	3–0	2–0	0–2
Ried	2–3	1–2	1–0	2–3	2–2	1–1		2–2	2–2	0–2
Rapid Wien	0–1	1–0	1–1	3–1	0–4	0–1	2–0		3–1	0–2
Sturm Graz	1–1	1–0	2–1	3–0	2–0	3–0	2–0	1–1		0–1
Tirol Innsbruck	6–0	3–0	1–0	5–0	7–0	3–0	0–0	2–0	0–0	

Source: weltfussball.de (in German)
Legend: Blue = home team win; Yellow = draw; Red = away team win.

=== Second half of season ===
Home \ Away	ADM	ASZ	AWI	BRE	GAK	KÄR	RIE	RWI	STU	TIR
Admira Wacker Mödling		2–2	0–5	0–2	0–2	0–0	1–3	0–1	3–4	2–0
Austria Salzburg	2–0		1–0	2–1	1–0	0–1	0–1	6–1	3–5	1–1
Austria Wien	0–0	1–0		3–0	0–2	2–1	2–0	1–1	3–0	2–1
Bregenz	5–1	1–1	1–4		1–4	0–1	3–1	3–0	1–1	2–0
Grazer AK	5–1	0–0	1–1	5–0		3–0	4–1	2–2	1–1	0–0
Kärnten	3–1	3–1	2–2	1–2	1–0		2–1	1–1	2–2	2–1
Ried	0–0	0–1	1–0	0–2	0–1	1–0		2–0	1–1	0–1
Rapid Wien	3–2	1–0	1–1	2–2	1–1	2–0	2–1		3–0	0–1
Sturm Graz	3–0	1–2	1–2	4–1	2–2	5–1	3–0	1–0		1–0
Tirol Innsbruck	2–1	1–0	2–0	4–1	0–1	3–1	1–1	1–0	3–4	

Source: weltfussball.de (in German)
Legend: Blue = home team win; Yellow = draw; Red = away team win.

== Top goalscorers ==
Rank	Scorer	Club	Goals
1	(Austria) Ronald Brunmayr	Grazer AK	27
2	(Belgium) Axel Lawarée	SW Bregenz	20
3	(Austria) Ivica Vastić	Sturm Graz	17
4	(Austria) Roman Wallner	Rapid Wien	15
5	(Austria) Mario Haas	Sturm Graz	12
5	(Croatia) Marijo Marić	FC Kärnten	12
5	(Austria) Christian Mayrleb	Austria Wien	12
8	(Poland) Radosław Gilewicz	Tirol Innsbruck	11
8	(Norway) Sigurd Rushfeldt	Austria Wien	11
8	(Netherlands) Erik Regtop	SW Bregenz	11

== Attendances ==
#	Club	Average
1	Tirol	10,157
2	Sturm	10,057
3	GAK	7,294
4	Kärnten	6,964
5	Rapid	6,172
6	Salzburg	5,306
7	Austria	5,111
8	Bregenz	4,648
9	Ried	3,076
10	Admira	1,648
