= 2000–01 Austrian Football Bundesliga =

83rd season of top-tier football league in Austria

Austrian Bundesliga
- Season: 2000–01
- Champions: FC Tirol Innsbruck

Statistics of Austrian Football Bundesliga in the 2000–01 season.

== Overview ==
It was contested by 10 teams, and FC Tirol Innsbruck won the championship.

=== Teams and location ===
Location of teams in the 2000–01 Austrian Football Bundesliga

Teams of 2000-01 Austrian Football Bundesliga

- FC Admira/Wacker
- Austria Salzburg
- Austria Wien
- Bregenz
- Grazer AK
- LASK
- Rapid Wien
- SV Ried
- Sturm Graz
- Tirol Innsbruck

== League standings ==
Pos	Team	Pld	W	D	L	GF	GA	GD	Pts	Qualification or relegation
1	Tirol Innsbruck (C)	36	20	8	8	63	31	+32	68	Qualification to Champions League third qualifying round
2	Rapid Wien	36	16	12	8	62	36	+26	60	Qualification to UEFA Cup qualifying round
3	Grazer AK	36	16	9	11	49	40	+9	57	Qualification to UEFA Cup qualifying round
4	Sturm Graz	36	16	7	13	58	44	+14	55	Qualification to Intertoto Cup second round
5	Austria Wien	36	14	8	14	47	43	+4	50	
6	Austria Salzburg	36	13	10	13	49	45	+4	49	
7	Ried	36	13	9	14	51	52	−1	48	Qualification to Intertoto Cup first round
8	Bregenz	36	10	8	18	40	67	−27	38	
9	Admira Wacker Mödling	36	8	12	16	29	63	−34	36	
10	LASK Linz (R)	36	8	9	19	43	70	−27	33	Relegation to Austrian First Football League

Source: weltfussball.de (in German)
Rules for classification: 1) points; 2) goal difference; 3) number of goals scored.
(C) Champions; (R) Relegated

== Results ==
Teams played each other four times in the league. In the first half of the season each team played every other team twice (home and away), and then did the same in the second half of the season.

=== First half of season ===
Home \ Away	ADM	ASZ	AWI	BRE	GAK	LIN	RIE	RWI	STU	TIR
Admira Wacker Mödling		2–0	0–0	0–1	0–4	2–2	0–5	2–4	0–1	1–0
Austria Salzburg	3–1		2–0	2–0	4–0	4–1	0–0	0–3	1–0	1–1
Austria Wien	0–0	3–1		2–1	4–0	5–0	2–1	3–2	1–2	0–2
Bregenz	1–2	5–1	2–1		2–1	2–2	0–0	1–1	2–1	2–2
Grazer AK	5–1	1–1	1–0	2–0		3–1	0–3	2–0	2–0	0–2
LASK Linz	1–1	0–2	1–3	3–1	0–1		1–1	2–1	2–1	0–2
Ried	3–2	1–1	1–3	3–1	2–3	1–0		2–3	2–1	1–1
Rapid Wien	1–0	3–0	1–1	2–1	1–1	2–0	2–1		4–1	2–1
Sturm Graz	5–0	1–2	1–1	4–2	1–1	5–1	4–2	1–1		3–0
Tirol Innsbruck	6–1	2–0	0–2	2–0	1–1	3–0	2–0	1–0	3–0	

Source: weltfussball.de (in German)
Legend: Blue = home team win; Yellow = draw; Red = away team win.

=== Second half of season ===
Home \ Away	ADM	ASZ	AWI	BRE	GAK	LIN	RIE	RWI	STU	TIR
Admira Wacker Mödling		0–0	1–0	1–1	1–0	1–1	0–0	0–2	2–2	0–2
Austria Salzburg	0–0		4–1	5–0	1–2	3–1	4–3	0–3	0–1	0–1
Austria Wien	2–0	1–1		1–1	0–1	3–1	1–1	2–0	1–0	0–2
Bregenz	0–0	2–0	2–1		1–0	1–2	2–3	1–0	0–3	1–0
Grazer AK	1–1	1–1	2–0	2–2		1–0	4–1	0–1	1–2	3–0
LASK Linz	1–3	1–1	4–1	5–0	0–0		2–0	3–3	2–1	1–2
Ried	0–1	1–3	0–0	1–0	2–1	1–0		2–0	1–3	3–1
Rapid Wien	1–2	0–0	2–0	5–0	1–1	6–0	1–1		0–0	2–2
Sturm Graz	3–1	2–1	2–0	3–1	0–1	2–1	0–1	1–1		1–1
Tirol Innsbruck	5–0	1–0	1–2	4–1	3–0	1–1	3–1	1–1	2–0	

Source: weltfussball.de (in German)
Legend: Blue = home team win; Yellow = draw; Red = away team win.

== Top goalscorers ==
Rank	Scorer	Club	Goals
1	(Poland) Radosław Gilewicz	Tirol Innsbruck	22
2	(Austria) Christian Mayrleb	Austria Wien	18
3	(Austria) Ronald Brunmayr	Grazer AK	14
3	(Norway) Geir Frigård	LASK Linz	14
5	(Denmark) Thomas Ambrosius	SW Bregenz	13
5	(Austria) Herwig Drechsel	SV Ried	13
5	(Croatia) Igor Pamić	Grazer AK	13
8	(Austria) Muhammet Akagündüz	SV Ried	12
8	(Germany) Heiko Laessig	Austria Salzburg	12
10	(Honduras) Juan Cárcamo	Austria Salzburg	11

== Attendances ==
#	Club	Average
1	Tirol	13,131
2	Sturm	10,831
3	Rapid	7,736
4	GAK	5,631
5	Austria	5,559
6	Salzburg	5,172
7	Bregenz	5,055
8	LASK	4,923
9	Ried	4,249
10	Admira	2,514
