= FC Tirol Innsbruck =

Austrian football club, based in Innsbruck

- Full name: Fußballclub Tirol Innsbruck
- Founded: 1993; 33 years ago
- Dissolved: 2002; 24 years ago
- Ground: Tivoli-Neu
- Capacity: 17,200
- League: Austrian Bundesliga
- 2001–02: 1st (relegated)
Home colours	Away colours

FC Tirol Innsbruck was an Austrian association football club from Innsbruck, Tyrol which existed between 1993 and 2002, when bankruptcy was declared.

== History ==
Tirol Innsbruck was formed after the dissolvement of FC Swarovski Tirol in 1992 which was the second split-off of FC Wacker Innsbruck, whose Bundesliga license it had lost at the end of the 1992–93 season. The club reached the final of the Intertoto Cup in 1995, losing to Strasbourg. The club, at first named FC Innsbruck Tirol, won the Austrian football championship three times. In the 1999-2000, 2000-2001 and 2001-2002 season. Soon after winning the championship in the 2001-2002 season the club had to file for bankruptcy and disbanded after losing the Bundesliga license on 21 June 2002 for the 2002/03 season. FC Wacker Innsbruck (2002) was then formed as a phoenix club.

=== Domestic history ===
Season	League									Austrian Cup	Top goalscorer		Manager
Season	Div.	Pos.	Pl.	W	D	L	GS	GA	P	Austrian Cup	Name	League	Manager
1993–94	1st	4th	36	14	11	11	48	33	39				(Germany) H.Köppel (Austria) W.Schwarz
1994–95	1st	5th	36	15	10	11	61	44	40		(Senegal) Souleyman Sané	20	(Austria) H.Krankl
1995–96	1st	3rd	36	18	8	10	64	40	62		(Poland) Jerzy Brzęczek (Austria) Thomas Janeschitz (Austria) Gernot Krinner	9	(Austria) D.Constantini
1996–97	1st	4th	36	16	7	13	49	40	55				(Austria) D.Constantini
1997–98	1st	6th	36	12	12	12	49	51	48	Quarterfinal			(Austria) H.Peischl (Czech Republic) F.Cipro
1998–99	1st	6th	36	15	10	11	49	41	55				(Czech Republic) F.Cipro (Austria) K.Jara
1999–2000	1st	1st	36	24	5	7	54	30	77	Quarterfinal			(Austria) K.Jara
2000–01	1st	1st	36	20	8	8	63	31	68	Runner Up			(Austria) K.Jara
2001–02	1st	1st	36	23	6	7	63	20	75				(Austria) K.Jara (Germany) J.Löw

=== European history ===
- Q = Qualifying QF = Quarterfinal SF = Semifinal

Season	Competition	Round	Country	Club	Home	Away	Aggregate
1993–94	UEFA Cup Winners' Cup	1	(Hungary)	Ferencváros	3–0	1–2	5–1
1993–94	UEFA Cup Winners' Cup	2	(Spain)	Real Madrid	1–1	3–0	1–4
1994–95	UEFA Cup	1	(Georgia (country))	Dinamo Tbilisi	5–1	1–0	5–2
1994–95	UEFA Cup	2	(Spain)	Deportivo	2–0	4–0	2–4
1996–97	UEFA Cup	Q2	(Bulgaria)	Slavia Sofia	4–1	1–1	5–2
1996–97	UEFA Cup	1	(France)	Metz	0–0	1–0	0–1
1997–98	UEFA Cup	Q2	(Scotland)	Celtic	2–1	3-6	5–7
2000–01	UEFA Champions League	Q3	(Spain)	Valencia	0–0	4–1	1–4
2000–01	UEFA Cup	1	(Italy)	Fiorentina	3–1	2–2	5–3
2000–01	UEFA Cup	2	(Germany)	VfB Stuttgart	1–0	3–1	2–3
2001–02	UEFA Champions League	Q3	(Russia)	Lokomotiv Moscow	1–0	3–1	2–3
2001–02	UEFA Cup	1	(Czech Republic)	Viktoria Žižkov	1–0	0–0	1–0
2001–02	UEFA Cup	2	(Italy)	Fiorentina	2–2	2–0	2–4

== Honours ==
- Austrian Championship
  - Champions (3): 1999–2000, 2000–01, 2001–02

== Manager history ==
- (Germany) Horst Köppel (1 July 1993 – 15 May 1994)
- (Austria) Wolfgang Schwarz (interim) (16 May 1994 – 30 June 1994)
- (Austria) Hans Krankl (1 July 1994 – 30 June 1995)
- (Austria) Dietmar Constantini (1 July 1995 – 26 July 1997)
- (Austria) Heinz Peischl (interim) (27 July 1997 – 4 Oct 1997)
- (Czech Republic) František Cipro (5 Oct 1997 – 31 Dec 1998)
- (Austria) Kurt Jara (1 Jan 1999 – 4 Oct 2001)
- (Germany) Joachim Löw (10 Oct 2001 – 30 June 2002)
