= 1997 UEFA Intertoto Cup =

Tournament details
- Dates: 21 June – 26 August 1997
- Teams: 60

Final positions
- Champions: (France) Lyon (France) Bastia (France) Auxerre

Tournament statistics
- Matches played: 138
- Goals scored: 408 (2.96 per match)

The 1997 UEFA Intertoto Cup finals were won by three French teams – Lyon, Bastia, and Auxerre. All three teams advanced to the UEFA Cup.

== Qualified teams ==
Qualified teams for 1997 UEFA Intertoto Cup
Entry round	Teams			
Group stage	(Austria) GAK (5th)	Austria Vienna (6th)	(Austria) Ried (7th)	(Belarus) Dinamo-93 Minsk (4th)
Group stage	(Belgium) Lommel (5th)	(Belgium) Royal Antwerp (6th)	(Belgium) Standard Liège (7th)	(Belgium) Genk (8th)
Group stage	(Bulgaria) Spartak Varna (9th)	(Croatia) Hrvatski Dragovoljac (3rd)	(Cyprus) Nea Salamis Famagusta (8th)	(Denmark) AaB (5th)
Group stage	(Denmark) Silkeborg (6th)	(Denmark) Odense (7th)	(Faroe Islands) B36 Tórshavn (4th)	(Finland) TPS (3rd)
Group stage	(France) Auxerre (6th)	(France) Bastia (7th)	(France) Lyon (8th)	(France) Montpellier (10th)
Group stage	(Georgia (country)) Merani-91 Tbilisi (4th)	(Germany) Werder Bremen (8th)	(Germany) Duisburg (9th)	(Germany) Köln (10th)
Group stage	(Germany) Hamburg (13th)	(Greece) Iraklis (13th)	(Greece) Panachaiki (15th)	(Hungary) Vasas (4th)
Group stage	(Iceland) Leiftur (3rd)	(Israel) Maccabi Petah Tikva (4th)	(Israel) Maccabi Haifa (5th)	(Latvia) Universitāte Rīga (4th)
Group stage	(Lithuania) Kaunas (4th)	(Malta) Floriana (3rd)	(Northern Ireland) Ards (8th)	(Netherlands) Heerenveen (7th)
Group stage	(Netherlands) Groningen (10th)	(Norway) Stabæk (6th)	(Norway) Kongsvinger (7th)	(Poland) Odra Wodzisław (3rd)
Group stage	(Poland) Polonia Warsaw (8th)	(Republic of Ireland) Cork City (4th)	(Romania) Rapid Bucharest (8th)	(Romania) Gloria Bistrița (13th)
Group stage	(Russia) Dynamo Moscow (4th)	(Russia) Lokomotiv Nizhny Novgorod (8th)	(Russia) Torpedo Moscow (12th)	(Slovakia) Žilina (9th)
Group stage	(Slovenia) Publikum Celje (4th)	(Sweden) Öster (6th)	(Sweden) Halmstad (7th)	(Switzerland) Lausanne Sports (4th)
Group stage	(Switzerland) Aarau (5th)	(Turkey) İstanbulspor (6th)	(Turkey) Samsunspor (9th)	(Turkey) Antalyaspor (10th)
Group stage	(Wales) Ebbw Vale (3rd)	(Federal Republic of Yugoslavia) Hajduk Kula (4th)	(Federal Republic of Yugoslavia) Proleter Zrenjanin (5th)	(Federal Republic of Yugoslavia) Čukarički Stankom (6th)

== Group stage ==
=== Group 1 ===
Pos	Team	Pld	W	D	L	GF	GA	GD	Pts	Qualification	DUI	D93	AAL	HEE	PWA
1	(Germany) Duisburg	4	3	1	0	5	0	+5	10	Advanced to semi-finals	—	—	2–0	2–0	—
2	(Belarus) Dinamo-93 Minsk	4	2	0	2	6	4	+2	6		0–1	—	—	1–0	—
3	(Denmark) AaB	4	2	0	2	6	11	−5	6		—	2–1	—	—	2–0
4	(Netherlands) Heerenveen	4	1	1	2	8	5	+3	4		—	—	8–2	—	0–0
5	(Poland) Polonia Warsaw	4	0	2	2	1	6	−5	2		0–0	1–4	—	—	—

Source: rsssf.com
21 June 1997

Dinamo-93 Minsk (Belarus)	1–0	(Netherlands) Heerenveen
Akulich 52'

Dinamo Stadium, Minsk
Attendance: 1,255
Referee: Tore Hollung (Norway)

22 June 1997

AaB (Denmark)	2–0	(Poland) Polonia Warsaw
Højer 70'; Pedersen 84'

Aalborg Stadium, Aalborg
Referee: Per-Olof Ståhl (Sweden)

28 June 1997

Duisburg (Germany)	2–0	(Denmark) AaB
Osthoff 18'; Wolters 83'

Wedaustadion, Duisburg
Attendance: 9,663
Referee: Romāns Lajuks (Latvia)

29 June 1997

Polonia Warsaw (Poland)	1–4	(Belarus) Dinamo-93 Minsk
Wędzyński 38'		Turchinovich 50', 82'; Akulich 53'; Avgul 68'

Stadion OSIR, Zamość
Attendance: 413
Referee: Sašo Lazarevski (Macedonia)

5 July 1997

Dinamo-93 Minsk (Belarus)	0–1	(Germany) Duisburg
		Zeyer 22'

Dinamo Stadium, Minsk
Attendance: 3,000
Referee: Khagani Mammadov (Azerbaijan)

6 July 1997

Heerenveen (Netherlands)	0–0	(Poland) Polonia Warsaw

Abe Lenstra Stadion, Heerenveen
Attendance: 6,200
Referee: Slavik Kazaryan (Armenia)

12 July 1997

Duisburg (Germany)	2–0	(Netherlands) Heerenveen
Osthoff 48'; Hirsch 64'

Wedaustadion, Duisburg
Attendance: 8,160
Referee: Víctor Esquinas Torres (Spain)

13 July 1997

AaB (Denmark)	2–1	(Belarus) Dinamo-93 Minsk
Frederiksen 31'; Højer 82'		Turchinovich 71'

Aalborg Stadium, Aalborg
Referee: Kristinn Jakobsson (Iceland)

19 July 1997

Polonia Warsaw (Poland)	0–0	(Germany) Duisburg

Stadion Miejski, Łęczna
Attendance: 400
Referee: Sven Kjelbrott (Norway)

20 July 1997

Heerenveen (Netherlands)	8–2	(Denmark) AaB
Samardžić 22', 35'; Gusatu 32', 51'; Talan 40', 43' de Visser 45' (pen.); El-Khattabi 84'		Højer 61', 67'

Abe Lenstra Stadion, Heerenveen
Referee: Alfred Micallef (Malta)

=== Group 2 ===
Pos	Team	Pld	W	D	L	GF	GA	GD	Pts	Qualification	BAS	GRA	SIL	HRV	EBB
1	(France) Bastia	4	3	0	1	5	3	+2	9	Advanced to semi-finals	—	1–2	1–0	—	—
2	(Austria) GAK	4	2	1	1	5	4	+1	7		—	—	2–0	1–3	—
3	(Denmark) Silkeborg	4	2	0	2	11	4	+7	6		—	—	—	5–0	6–1
4	(Croatia) Hrvatski Dragovoljac	4	2	0	2	7	7	0	6		0–1	—	—	—	4–0
5	(Wales) Ebbw Vale	4	0	1	3	2	12	−10	1		1–2	0–0	—	—	—

Source: rsssf.com
21 June 1997

GAK (Austria)	2–0	(Denmark) Silkeborg
Aničić 39'; Vuković 73'	Report

GAK-Platz, Graz
Attendance: 800
Referee: Mikko Vuorela (Finland)

22 June 1997

Hrvatski Dragovoljac (Croatia)	0–1	(France) Bastia
	Report	Šiljak 45'

Stadion Stanko Vlajnić-Dida, Slavonski Brod
Attendance: 3,000
Referee: Carlo Bertolini (Switzerland)

28 June 1997

Silkeborg (Denmark)	5–0	(Croatia) Hrvatski Dragovoljac
Živković 14'; Joković 25'; Šuika 30', 50'; Bordinggaard 71'

Silkeborg Stadium, Silkeborg
Attendance: 741
Referee: Valentin Ivanov (Russia)

29 June 1997

Ebbw Vale (Wales)	0–0	(Austria) GAK
	Report

Eugene Cross Park, Ebbw Vale
Attendance: 774
Referee: Herbert Barr (Northern Ireland)

5 July 1997

Hrvatski Dragovoljac (Croatia)	4–0	(Wales) Ebbw Vale
Musa 14'; Đolonga 24'; Katulić 67', 90'	Report

Stadion Radnik, Velika Gorica
Attendance: 420
Referee: Ronald Beck (Liechtenstein)

5 July 1997

Bastia (France)	1–0	(Denmark) Silkeborg
Šiljak 24'	Report

Stade Armand Cesari, Bastia
Attendance: 3,000
Referee: Carlo Bertolini (Switzerland)

12 July 1997

GAK (Austria)	1–3	(Croatia) Hrvatski Dragovoljac
Sabitzer 73'	Report	Musa 7'; Škopljanac 16'; Vukoja 40'

Arnold Schwarzenegger-Stadion, Graz
Attendance: 1,200
Referee: Merab Malagouradze (Georgia)

13 July 1997

Ebbw Vale (Wales)	1–2	(France) Bastia
Tyler 54'	Report	Šiljak 12', 31'

Eugene Cross Park, Ebbw Vale
Attendance: 950
Referee: Mike McCurry (Scotland)

19 July 1997

Silkeborg (Denmark)	6–1	(Wales) Ebbw Vale
Fernandez 5'; Joković 30', 73'; Thygesen 69', 71' (pen.), 90'		Webley 70'

Silkeborg Stadium, Silkeborg
Referee: Stefan Ormandzhiev (Bulgaria)

19 July 1997

Bastia (France)	1–2	(Austria) GAK
F. Mendy 45'	Report	Kulovits 25'; Ramusch 52'

Stade Armand Cesari, Bastia
Attendance: 2,500
Referee: Zygmunt Ziober (Poland)

=== Group 3 ===
Pos	Team	Pld	W	D	L	GF	GA	GD	Pts	Qualification	AUX	LS	ANT	NSL	ARD
1	(France) Auxerre	4	3	1	0	19	2	+17	10	Advanced to semi-finals	—	1–1	5–0	—	—
2	(Switzerland) Lausanne Sports	4	2	2	0	13	4	+9	8		—	—	—	4–1	6–0
3	(Belgium) Royal Antwerp	4	2	1	1	7	7	0	7		—	2–2	—	4–0	—
4	(Cyprus) Nea Salamis Famagusta	4	1	0	3	6	19	−13	3		1–10	—	—	—	4–1
5	(Northern Ireland) Ards	4	0	0	4	1	14	−13	0		0–3	—	0–1	—	—

Source: rsssf.com
21 June 1997

Ards (Northern Ireland)	0–1	(Belgium) Royal Antwerp
		Kiekens 16' (pen.)

Castlereagh Park, Newtownards
Attendance: 1,000
Referee: Roger Philippi (Luxembourg)

22 June 1997

Lausanne Sports (Switzerland)	4–1	(Cyprus) Nea Salamis Famagusta
Iglesias 20'; Hänzi 56'; N'Kufo 59', 81'		Mihić 90'

Stade Olympique de la Pontaise, Lausanne
Attendance: 800
Referee: Grujica Tomić (Croatia)

28 June 1997

Auxerre (France)	1–1	(Switzerland) Lausanne Sports
Guivarc'h 38'		Ohrel 45' (pen.)

Stade Abbé-Deschamps, Auxerre
Attendance: 3,917
Referee: Emanuel Zammit (Malta)

29 June 1997

Nea Salamis Famagusta (Cyprus)	4–1	(Northern Ireland) Ards
Ilias 53', 80'; Kovačević 59' (pen.); Mihić 78' (pen.)		Bowers 84' (pen.)

Ammochostos Stadium, Larnaca
Attendance: 840
Referee: Andrey Butenko (Russia)

5 July 1997

Ards (Northern Ireland)	0–3	(France) Auxerre
		Compan 65'; Sibierski 79'; Guivarc'h 89'

Castlereagh Park, Newtownards
Referee: Zoran Arsić (FR Yugoslavia)

6 July 1997

Royal Antwerp (Belgium)	4–0	(Cyprus) Nea Salamis Famagusta
Glogovac 21'; Pivaljević 48', 60' da Silva 88'

Bosuilstadion, Antwerp
Referee: Eyal Zur (Israel)

12 July 1997

Auxerre (France)	5–0	(Belgium) Royal Antwerp
Diomède 11', 30'; Marlet 25'; Guivarc'h 59', 72'

Stade Abbé-Deschamps, Auxerre
Attendance: 5,000
Referee: Attila Juhos (Hungary)

13 July 1997

Lausanne Sports (Switzerland)	6–0	(Northern Ireland) Ards
Hänzi 28', 38'; Iglesias 52'; Carrasco 72'; Celestini 76' (pen.); Douglas 79' (pen.)

Stade Olympique de la Pontaise, Lausanne
Attendance: 1,070
Referee: Vladimir Antonov (Moldova)

19 July 1997

Nea Salamis Famagusta (Cyprus)	1–10	(France) Auxerre
Demetriou 86'		Guivarc'h 13', 20', 24', 54', 84'; Diomède 51', 81'; Lachuer 66', 77'; Marlet 70'

Ammochostos Stadium, Larnaca
Attendance: 400
Referee: Gerry Perry (Ireland)

20 July 1997

Royal Antwerp (Belgium)	2–2	(Switzerland) Lausanne Sports
da Silva 58'; Kiekens 73' (pen.)		Douglas 39'; Thurre 62'

Bosuilstadion, Antwerp
Attendance: 2,000
Referee: Igor Horozhankin (Ukraine)

=== Group 4 ===
Pos	Team	Pld	W	D	L	GF	GA	GD	Pts	Qualification	KÖLN	MPT	STA	COR	AAR
1	(Germany) Köln	4	3	1	0	9	2	+7	10	Advanced to semi-finals	—	—	1–1	—	3–0
2	(Israel) Maccabi Petah Tikva	4	1	2	1	2	3	−1	5		1–3	—	—	0–0	—
3	(Belgium) Standard Liège	4	0	4	0	1	1	0	4		—	0–0	—	—	0–0
4	(Republic of Ireland) Cork City	4	0	3	1	0	2	−2	3		0–2	—	0–0	—	—
5	(Switzerland) Aarau	4	0	2	2	0	4	−4	2		—	0–1	—	0–0	—

Source: rsssf.com
21 June 1997

Maccabi Petah Tikva (Israel)	1–3	(Germany) Köln
Tal 53'		Munteanu 3'; Gaißmayer 37'; Tretschok 75'

Ramat Gan Stadium, Ramat Gan
Attendance: 302
Referee: Philippe Leduc (France)

22 June 1997

Standard Liège (Belgium)	0–0	(Switzerland) Aarau

Stade Maurice Dufrasne, Liège
Attendance: 2,412
Referee: Livio Bazzoli (Italy)

28 June 1997

Cork City (Republic of Ireland)	0–0	(Belgium) Standard Liège

Turners Cross, Cork
Attendance: 1,950
Referee: Costas Kapitanis (Cyprus)

29 June 1997

Aarau (Switzerland)	0–1	(Israel) Maccabi Petah Tikva
		Biala 74'

Stadion Brügglifeld, Aarau
Attendance: 1,400
Referee: Marcel Lică (Romania)

5 July 1997

Maccabi Petah Tikva (Israel)	0–0	(Republic of Ireland) Cork City

Kiryat Eliezer Stadium, Haifa
Referee: Mustafa Çulcu (Turkey)

6 July 1997

Köln (Germany)	3–0	(Switzerland) Aarau
Vlădoiu 22', 29', 84'

Südstadion, Cologne
Attendance: 11,000
Referee: Milan Mitrović (Slovenia)

12 July 1997

Cork City (Republic of Ireland)	0–2	(Germany) Köln
		Munteanu 31'; Polster 53'

Turners Cross, Cork
Attendance: 4,000
Referee: Robert Sedlacek (Austria)

13 July 1997

Standard Liège (Belgium)	0–0	(Israel) Maccabi Petah Tikva

Stade Maurice Dufrasne, Liège
Attendance: 4,000
Referee: Tomasz Mikulski (Poland)

19 July 1997

Aarau (Switzerland)	0–0	(Republic of Ireland) Cork City

Stadion Brügglifeld, Aarau
Attendance: 700
Referee: Željko Širić (Croatia)

20 July 1997

Köln (Germany)	1–1	(Belgium) Standard Liège
Gaißmayer 16'		Mpenza 37'

Südstadion, Cologne
Attendance: 8,700
Referee: Jan Wegereef (Netherlands)

=== Group 5 ===
Pos	Team	Pld	W	D	L	GF	GA	GD	Pts	Qualification	DYN	GEN	STA	PAN	B36
1	(Russia) Dynamo Moscow	4	3	1	0	7	4	+3	10	Advanced to semi-finals	—	3–2	—	2–1	—
2	(Belgium) Genk	4	3	0	1	15	8	+7	9		—	—	4–3	4–2	—
3	(Norway) Stabæk	4	1	2	1	10	6	+4	5		1–1	—	—	—	5–0
4	(Greece) Panachaiki	4	1	1	2	8	9	−1	4		—	—	1–1	—	4–2
5	(Faroe Islands) B36 Tórshavn	4	0	0	4	2	15	−13	0		0–1	0–5	—	—	—

Source: rsssf.com
21 June 1997

B36 Tórshavn (Faroe Islands)	0–5	(Belgium) Genk
		Keïta 2', 6', 49'; Oulare 63'; Konon 80'

Svangaskarð, Toftir
Attendance: 553
Referee: John McDermott (Ireland)

22 June 1997

Panachaiki (Greece)	1–1	(Norway) Stabæk
Block 7'		Mayer 58'

Kostas Davourlis Stadium, Patras
Attendance: 500
Referee: Konrad Plautz (Austria)

28 June 1997

Dynamo Moscow (Russia)	2–1	(Greece) Panachaiki
Shtanyuk 8'; Kutsenko 43'		Klejch 12'

Central Dynamo Stadium, Moscow
Attendance: 3,500
Referee: Knud Stadsgaard (Denmark)

29 June 1997

Stabæk (Norway)	5–0	(Faroe Islands) B36 Tórshavn
Sigurðsson 36', 72'; Stavrum 66'; Stenersen 71'; Kolle 88'

Nadderud Stadion, Bekkestua
Attendance: 313
Referee: Oleg Timofeev (Estonia)

5 July 1997

B36 Tórshavn (Faroe Islands)	0–1	(Russia) Dynamo Moscow
		Astrowski 78'

Svangaskarð, Toftir
Attendance: 200
Referee: Raymond Ellingham (Wales)

6 July 1997

Genk (Belgium)	4–3	(Norway) Stabæk
Keïta 1'; Oulare 2', 17'; N'Sumbu 29'		Sigurðsson 52', 64'; Frigård 86'

Thyl Gheyselinckstadion, Genk
Referee: Algirdas Dubinskas (Lithuania)

12 July 1997

Dynamo Moscow (Russia)	3–2	(Belgium) Genk
Terekhin 22'; Kulchiy 37'; Korablyov 44'		Oulare 27'; Keïta 48'

Central Dynamo Stadium, Moscow
Attendance: 3,000
Referee: Anton Getsov (Bulgaria)

13 July 1997

Panachaiki (Greece)	4–2	(Faroe Islands) B36 Tórshavn
Katsouranis 13'; Karipov 18'; Haxhi 71', 78'		Petersen 56', 75'

Kostas Davourlis Stadium, Patras
Referee: Marco Tura (San Marino)

19 July 1997

Stabæk (Norway)	1–1	(Russia) Dynamo Moscow
Skistad 75'		Kosolapov 46'

Nadderud Stadion, Bekkestua
Attendance: 315
Referee: Mirosław Milewski (Poland)

20 July 1997

Genk (Belgium)	4–2	(Greece) Panachaiki
Oulare 14'; Hendrikx 20'; Keïta 51'; Delbroek 57'		Meidanis 84'; Vaitsis 88'

Thyl Gheyselinckstadion, Genk
Referee: Haïm Lipkovitz (Israel)

=== Group 6 ===
Pos	Team	Pld	W	D	L	GF	GA	GD	Pts	Qualification	HAM	SAM	KAU	LEI	OB
1	(Germany) Hamburg	4	4	0	0	9	4	+5	12	Advanced to semi-finals	—	3–1	—	—	2–1
2	(Turkey) Samsunspor	4	3	0	1	7	3	+4	9		—	—	—	3–0	2–0
3	(Lithuania) Kaunas	4	1	1	2	6	7	−1	4		1–2	0–1	—	—	—
4	(Iceland) Leiftur	4	1	0	3	7	11	−4	3		1–2	—	2–3	—	—
5	(Denmark) Odense	4	0	1	3	6	10	−4	1		—	—	2–2	3–4	—

Source: rsssf.com
21 June 1997

Samsunspor (Turkey)	2–0	(Denmark) Odense
İşler 32'; Taşdemir 55'

Samsun 19 Mayıs Stadium, Samsun
Referee: Dieter Schoch (Switzerland)

22 June 1997

Leiftur (Iceland)	1–2	(Germany) Hamburg
Lazorik 87'		Schopp 14'; Weetendorf 49'

Ólafsfjarðarvöllur, Ólafsfjörður
Attendance: 1,488
Referee: Morgan Norman (Sweden)

28 June 1997

Kaunas (Lithuania)	0–1	(Turkey) Samsunspor
		Akdeniz 84'

Darius and Girėnas Stadium, Kaunas
Attendance: 2,500
Referee: John Ferry (Northern Ireland)

29 June 1997

Odense (Denmark)	3–4	(Iceland) Leiftur
Hansen 8'; Henriksen 74'; El Banna 83'		Lazorik 34'; Bragason 42'; Gíslason 76'; Bjarnason 78'

Nørre Aaby Sports Park, Nørre Aaby
Attendance: 563
Referee: Jüri Saar (Estonia)

5 July 1997

Leiftur (Iceland)	2–3	(Lithuania) Kaunas
Lazorik 87' (pen.); Gíslason 89'		Buitkus 27'; Trakys 36'; Bezykornovas 37'

Ólafsfjarðarvöllur, Ólafsfjörður
Referee: Jarmo Karhunen (Finland)

6 July 1997

Hamburg (Germany)	2–1	(Denmark) Odense
Weetendorf 34'; Breitenreiter 43'		Hjorth 14'

Volksparkstadion, Hamburg
Attendance: 7,754
Referee: Fiorenzo Treossi (Italy)

12 July 1997

Kaunas (Lithuania)	1–2	(Germany) Hamburg
Bezykornovas 34' (pen.)		Schopp 9'; Breitenreiter 43'

Žalgiris Stadium, Vilnius
Attendance: 1,000
Referee: Brian Lawlor (Wales)

13 July 1997

Samsunspor (Turkey)	3–0	(Iceland) Leiftur
Aykut 34'; İşler 64', 65'

Samsun 19 Mayıs Stadium, Samsun
Referee: Dietmar Drabek (Austria)

19 July 1997

Odense (Denmark)	2–2	(Lithuania) Kaunas
Nielsen 73'; Hansen 74'		Bezykornovas 7'; Trakys 40'

Odense Stadium, Odense
Referee: Zbigniew Marczyk (Poland)

20 July 1997

Hamburg (Germany)	3–1	(Turkey) Samsunspor
Weetendorf 41'; Spörl 67', 78'		İşler 14'

Volksparkstadion, Hamburg
Attendance: 21,463
Referee: Fernand Meese (Belgium)

=== Group 7 ===
Pos	Team	Pld	W	D	L	GF	GA	GD	Pts	Qualification	İST	VAS	BRE	ÖST	UNR
1	(Turkey) İstanbulspor	4	3	1	0	10	3	+7	10	Advanced to semi-finals	—	2–0	—	3–2	—
2	(Hungary) Vasas	4	3	0	1	9	3	+6	9		—	—	2–0	—	3–0
3	(Germany) Werder Bremen	4	2	1	1	5	3	+2	7		0–0	—	—	2–1	—
4	(Sweden) Öster	4	1	0	3	6	10	−4	3		—	1–4	—	—	2–1
5	(Latvia) Universitāte Rīga	4	0	0	4	2	13	−11	0		1–5	—	0–3	—	—

Source: rsssf.com
21 June 1997

Universitāte Rīga (Latvia)	1–5	(Turkey) İstanbulspor
Kril 15'		Kocaman 6'; Yavas 57'; Akyüz 60', 88', 90'

Latvijas Universitates Stadions, Riga
Attendance: 2,000
Referee: Lassin Isaksen (Faroe Islands)

22 June 1997

Öster (Sweden)	1–4	(Hungary) Vasas
Persson 73'		Fischer 4', 42' (pen.); Juhár 49'; Galaschek 61'

Värendsvallen, Växjö
Attendance: 222
Referee: Claude Détruche (Switzerland)

28 June 1997

Werder Bremen (Germany)	2–1	(Sweden) Öster
Labbadia 28'; Herzog 35' (pen.)		Ottosson 62'

Weser-Stadion, Bremen
Attendance: 16,200
Referee: Ladislav Gádoši (Slovakia)

29 June 1997

Vasas (Hungary)	3–0	(Latvia) Universitāte Rīga
Máriási 42' (pen.), 53' (pen.); Sáfár 44' (pen.)

Fáy utcai Stadion, Budapest
Attendance: 1,200
Referee: Sorin Corpodean (Romania)

5 July 1997

Universitāte Rīga (Latvia)	0–3	(Germany) Werder Bremen
		Labbadia 12' van Lent 35'; Herzog 79'

Latvijas Universitates Stadions, Riga
Attendance: 1,600
Referee: Karen Nalbandyan (Armenia)

6 July 1997

İstanbulspor (Turkey)	2–0	(Hungary) Vasas
Özdemir 62' (pen.); Akyüz 90'

Çetin Emeç Stadium, Bayrampaşa
Attendance: 6,798
Referee: Dick van Egmond (Netherlands)

12 July 1997

Werder Bremen (Germany)	0–0	(Turkey) İstanbulspor

Weser-Stadion, Bremen
Attendance: 17,600
Referee: Dermot Gallagher (England)

13 July 1997

Öster (Sweden)	2–1	(Latvia) Universitāte Rīga
Bakanin 6' (o.g.); Bild 35'		Bakanin 78'

Värendsvallen, Växjö
Attendance: 200
Referee: Bragi Bergmann (Iceland)

19 July 1997

Vasas (Hungary)	2–0	(Germany) Werder Bremen
Váczi 38'; Aranyos 90'

Fáy utcai Stadion, Budapest
Attendance: 4,000
Referee: Kazimir Znaydinski (Belarus)

20 July 1997

İstanbulspor (Turkey)	3–2	(Sweden) Öster
Yalçin 23'; Kocaman 80'; Akyüz 90'		Rubins 39'; Eklund 68'

Çetin Emeç Stadium, Bayrampaşa
Attendance: 10,004
Referee: Pascal Garibian (France)

=== Group 8 ===
Pos	Team	Pld	W	D	L	GF	GA	GD	Pts	Qualification	HAL	LOM	HAJ	TPS	KON
1	(Sweden) Halmstad	4	3	1	0	10	3	+7	10	Advanced to semi-finals	—	—	—	6–1	2–1
2	(Belgium) Lommel	4	1	3	0	6	5	+1	6		1–1	—	3–2	—	—
3	(Federal Republic of Yugoslavia) Hajduk Kula	4	2	0	2	6	5	+1	6		0–1	—	—	—	2–0
4	(Finland) TPS	4	1	1	2	5	9	−4	4		—	1–1	1–2	—	—
5	(Norway) Kongsvinger	4	0	1	3	2	7	−5	1		—	1–1	—	0–2	—

Source: rsssf.com
21 June 1997

Kongsvinger (Norway)	1–1	(Belgium) Lommel
Sætre 23' (pen.)		Klomp 67'

Gjemselund Stadion, Kongsvinger
Attendance: 489
Referee: Eyjölfur Ólafsson (Iceland)

22 June 1997

Hajduk Kula (Federal Republic of Yugoslavia)	0–1	(Sweden) Halmstad
		Mattsson 90'

Stadion Hajduk, Kula
Attendance: 5,000
Referee: Alain Hamer (Luxembourg)

28 June 1997

TPS (Finland)	1–2	(Federal Republic of Yugoslavia) Hajduk Kula
Casagrande 3'		Karanović 79'; Osmanović 86'

Kupittaan jalkapallostadion, Turku
Attendance: 726
Referee: Taras Bezubyak (Russia)

29 June 1997

Halmstad (Sweden)	2–1	(Norway) Kongsvinger
Andersson 59'; Vougt 78'		Johnsen 44'

Örjans Vall, Halmstad
Attendance: 766
Referee: Hans-Jürgen Weber (Germany)

5 July 1997

Kongsvinger (Norway)	0–2	(Finland) TPS
		Paija 45'; Meltoranta 75'

Gjemselund Stadion, Kongsvinger
Attendance: 902
Referee: Gintaras Dilda (Lithuania)

6 July 1997

Lommel (Belgium)	1–1	(Sweden) Halmstad
Eshun 27'		Arvidsson 35'

Stedelijk Sportstadion, Lommel
Referee: Bujar Pregja (Albania)

12 July 1997

TPS (Finland)	1–1	(Belgium) Lommel
Kokko 50'		Cannaerts 41'

Kupittaan jalkapallostadion, Turku
Referee: Attila Hanacsek (Hungary)

13 July 1997

Hajduk Kula (Federal Republic of Yugoslavia)	2–0	(Norway) Kongsvinger
Markoski 41'; Puhalak 58'

Stadion Hajduk, Kula
Attendance: 1,500
Referee: Naoum Mintiouris (Greece)

19 July 1997

Halmstad (Sweden)	6–1	(Finland) TPS
Andersson 10', 20'; Ljungberg 17'; Selaković 27'; Vougt 36', 74'		Meltoranta 83'

Örjans Vall, Halmstad
Attendance: 917
Referee: Jørn Larsen (Denmark)

20 July 1997

Lommel (Belgium)	3–2	(Federal Republic of Yugoslavia) Hajduk Kula
Klomp 49'; Nuyts 51'; Salmy 80'		Predić 34'; Kulić 71'

Stedelijk Sportstadion, Lommel
Referee: Arturo Daudén Ibáñez (Spain)

=== Group 9 ===
Pos	Team	Pld	W	D	L	GF	GA	GD	Pts	Qualification	LYO	RAP	ODR	ŽIL	AWI
1	(France) Lyon	4	4	0	0	14	3	+11	12	Advanced to semi-finals	—	—	5–2	—	2–0
2	(Romania) Rapid Bucharest	4	2	1	1	8	5	+3	7		1–2	—	—	2–0	—
3	(Poland) Odra Wodzisław	4	1	1	2	9	10	−1	4		—	2–4	—	0–0	—
4	(Slovakia) Žilina	4	1	1	2	3	8	−5	4		0–5	—	—	—	3–1
5	Austria Vienna	4	0	1	3	3	11	−8	1		—	1–1	1–5	—	—

Source: rsssf.com
21 June 1997

Žilina (Slovakia)	3–1	Austria Vienna
Barčík 37'; Kostolansky 47'; Kurek 58'	Report	Gager 79' (pen.)

Štadión pod Dubňom, Žilina
Attendance: 3,474
Referee: Srečko Kandare (Slovenia)

22 June 1997

Odra Wodzisław (Poland)	2–4	(Romania) Rapid Bucharest
Pluta 84'; Sibik 88'	Report	Staniek 5' (o.g.); Bugeanu 15', 41'; Andone 87'

MOSiR Stadium, Wodzisław Śląski
Attendance: 5,000
Referee: Vladislav Tóth (Hungary)

28 June 1997

Lyon (France)	5–2	(Poland) Odra Wodzisław
Caveglia 30'; Job 45', 46', 60'; Kanouté 73'	Report	Zagórski 33', 48'

Stade de Gerland, Lyon
Attendance: 7,250
Referee: Otar Guntadze (Georgia)

28 June 1997

Rapid Bucharest (Romania)	2–0	(Slovakia) Žilina
Bundea 84'; Constantinovici 88'	Report

Stadionul Giulești-Valentin Stănescu, Bucharest
Attendance: 8,000
Referee: Athanasios Zahariadis (Greece)

5 July 1997

Žilina (Slovakia)	0–5	(France) Lyon
	Report	Job 8'; Caveglia 33', 55'; Carteron 38'; Laville 66'

Štadión pod Dubňom, Žilina
Attendance: 3,000
Referee: Ante Kulušić (Croatia)

5 July 1997

Austria Vienna	1–1	(Romania) Rapid Bucharest
Kellner 68'	Report	Mohora 9'

Franz Horr Stadium, Vienna
Attendance: 1,500
Referee: Ihor Yarmenchuk (Ukraine)

12 July 1997

Odra Wodzisław (Poland)	0–0	(Slovakia) Žilina
	Report

City Stadium, Jastrzębie-Zdrój
Attendance: 1,000
Referee: Tahir Suleymanov (Azerbaijan)

12 July 1997

Lyon (France)	2–0	Austria Vienna
Dospel 48' (o.g.); Job 89'	Report

Stade de Gerland, Lyon
Attendance: 8,000
Referee: Joaquim Bento Marques (Portugal)

19 July 1997

Rapid Bucharest (Romania)	1–2	(France) Lyon
Butoiu 45'	Report	Giuly 82'; Roche 89'

Stadionul Giulești-Valentin Stănescu, Bucharest
Attendance: 5,000
Referee: Muhittin Boşat (Turkey)

20 July 1997

Austria Vienna	1–5	(Poland) Odra Wodzisław
Gager 25'	Report	Zagórski 2', 10', 55'; Sowisz 65'; Wieczorek 75'

Franz Horr Stadium, Vienna
Attendance: 1,000
Referee: Martin Ingvarsson (Sweden)

=== Group 10 ===
Pos	Team	Pld	W	D	L	GF	GA	GD	Pts	Qualification	MON	GRO	ČUK	GBI	SPA
1	(France) Montpellier	4	3	1	0	9	3	+6	10	Advanced to semi-finals	—	3–0	3–1	—	—
2	(Netherlands) Groningen	4	3	0	1	7	4	+3	9		—	—	1–0	4–1	—
3	(Federal Republic of Yugoslavia) Čukarički Stankom	4	2	0	2	7	6	+1	6		—	—	—	3–2	3–0
4	(Romania) Gloria Bistrița	4	1	0	3	6	10	−4	3		1–2	—	—	—	2–1
5	(Bulgaria) Spartak Varna	4	0	1	3	2	8	−6	1		1–1	0–2	—	—	—

Source: rsssf.com
21 June 1997

Gloria Bistrița (Romania)	1–2	(France) Montpellier
Oană 11'		Alicarte 51' (pen.); Ferhaoui 78'

Stadionul Municipal Gloria, Bistrița
Attendance: 780
Referee: Robert Boggi (Italy)

22 June 1997

Groningen (Netherlands)	1–0	(Federal Republic of Yugoslavia) Čukarički Stankom
Bombarda 61'

Stadion Oosterpark, Groningen
Attendance: 2,700
Referee: Sergei Khusainov (Russia)

28 June 1997

Spartak Varna (Bulgaria)	0–2	(Netherlands) Groningen
		Bombarda 70'; Atteveld 89' (pen.)

Stadion Spartak, Varna
Attendance: 3,900
Referee: Giorgos Bikas (Greece)

29 June 1997

Čukarički Stankom (Federal Republic of Yugoslavia)	3–2	(Romania) Gloria Bistrița
Budimirović 37'; Vukić 41'; Kišjuhas 86'		Cornea 20'; Glăvan 74'

Čukarički Stadium, Belgrade
Attendance: 500
Referee: Edgar Steinborn (Germany)

5 July 1997

Gloria Bistrița (Romania)	2–1	(Bulgaria) Spartak Varna
Oană 7'; Bărcăuan 73'		Hristov 80'

Stadionul Municipal Gloria, Bistrița
Referee: Eric Romain (Belgium)

6 July 1997

Montpellier (France)	3–1	(Federal Republic of Yugoslavia) Čukarički Stankom
Rouvière 41'; Sauzée 65' dos Santos 75'		Šćepanović 24'

Stade de la Mosson, Montpellier
Attendance: 3,034
Referee: Stephen Lodge (England)

12 July 1997

Spartak Varna (Bulgaria)	1–1	(France) Montpellier
Hristov 3'		Sauzée 79'

Stadion Spartak, Varna
Attendance: 1,200
Referee: Pavlín Jirků (Czech Republic)

13 July 1997

Groningen (Netherlands)	4–1	(Romania) Gloria Bistrița
Bombarda 9'; Huizingh 13'; Kooistra 25'; Magno 72'		Oană 29'

Stadion Oosterpark, Groningen
Attendance: 5,200
Referee: Oğuz Sarvan (Turkey)

19 July 1997

Čukarički Stankom (Federal Republic of Yugoslavia)	3–0	(Bulgaria) Spartak Varna
Budimirović 11'; Vukić 33', 42'

Čukarički Stadium, Belgrade
Attendance: 300
Referee: Juan Brito Arceo (Spain)

20 July 1997

Montpellier (France)	3–0	(Netherlands) Groningen
Deplace 12'; Rouvière 28'; Alicarte 64' (pen.)

Stade de la Mosson, Montpellier
Attendance: 4,500
Referee: Vladimír Hriňák (Slovakia)

=== Group 11 ===
Pos	Team	Pld	W	D	L	GF	GA	GD	Pts	Qualification	LNN	PUB	PZR	ANT	MHA
1	(Russia) Lokomotiv Nizhny Novgorod	4	4	0	0	8	1	+7	12	Advanced to semi-finals	—	—	1–0	1–0	—
2	(Slovenia) Publikum Celje	4	1	2	1	3	3	0	5		1–2	—	—	1–1	—
3	(Federal Republic of Yugoslavia) Proleter Zrenjanin	4	1	1	2	4	2	+2	4		—	0–0	—	—	4–0
4	(Turkey) Antalyaspor	4	1	1	2	2	4	−2	4		—	—	1–0	—	0–2
5	(Israel) Maccabi Haifa	4	1	0	3	2	9	−7	3		0–4	0–1	—	—	—

Source: rsssf.com
21 June 1997

Proleter Zrenjanin (Federal Republic of Yugoslavia)	4–0	(Israel) Maccabi Haifa
Zakić 7'; Mihajlović 45'; Lisica 64'; Zorić 90'

Stadion Karađorđev park, Zrenjanin
Attendance: 1,000
Referee: Jürgen Aust (Germany)

22 June 1997

Publikum Celje (Slovenia)	1–1	(Turkey) Antalyaspor
Sešlar 7'		Karamanoğlu 17'

Skalna Klet, Celje
Attendance: 500
Referee: Vančo Kocev (Macedonia)

28 June 1997

Lokomotiv Nizhny Novgorod (Russia)	1–0	(Federal Republic of Yugoslavia) Proleter Zrenjanin
Bystrov 30'	Report

Lokomotiv Stadium, Nizhny Novgorod
Attendance: 10,860
Referee: Sally Bernard (Republic of Ireland)

28 June 1997

Maccabi Haifa (Israel)	0–1	(Slovenia) Publikum Celje
		Sivko 8'

Kiryat Eliezer Stadium, Haifa
Attendance: 800
Referee: Giannakis Kiprianides (Cyprus)

5 July 1997

Publikum Celje (Slovenia)	1–2	(Russia) Lokomotiv Nizhny Novgorod
Sivko 45'	Report	Duyun 86'; Ionanidze 90'

Skalna Klet, Celje
Attendance: 2,000
Referee: Veselin Bogdanov (Bulgaria)

5 July 1997

Antalyaspor (Turkey)	0–2	(Israel) Maccabi Haifa
		Shum 2'; Halahla 21'

Antalya Atatürk Stadium, Antalya
Referee: Adrian Stoica (Romania)

12 July 1997

Lokomotiv Nizhny Novgorod (Russia)	1–0	(Turkey) Antalyaspor
Durnev 13'	Report

Lokomotiv Stadium, Nizhny Novgorod
Attendance: 10,000
Referee: Kenny Clark (Scotland)

12 July 1997

Proleter Zrenjanin (Federal Republic of Yugoslavia)	0–0	(Slovenia) Publikum Celje

Stadion Karađorđev park, Zrenjanin
Attendance: 2,000
Referee: Bohdan Benedik (Slovakia)

19 July 1997

Maccabi Haifa (Israel)	0–4	(Russia) Lokomotiv Nizhny Novgorod
	Report	Perednya 9'; Mordvinov 20'; Ionanidze 32'; Mukhamadiev 63'

Kiryat Eliezer Stadium, Haifa
Attendance: 200
Referee: Steve Dunn (England)

19 July 1997

Antalyaspor (Turkey)	1–0	(Federal Republic of Yugoslavia) Proleter Zrenjanin
N'Gole 78'

Antalya Atatürk Stadium, Antalya
Attendance: 350
Referee: Herman van Dijk (Netherlands)

=== Group 12 ===
Pos	Team	Pld	W	D	L	GF	GA	GD	Pts	Qualification	TOR	MTB	RIE	IRA	FLO
1	(Russia) Torpedo Moscow	4	4	0	0	9	1	+8	12	Advanced to semi-finals	—	—	2–0	4–1	—
2	(Georgia (country)) Merani-91 Tbilisi	4	2	0	2	8	5	+3	6		0–2	—	—	—	5–0
3	(Austria) Ried	4	2	0	2	6	7	−1	6		—	1–3	—	3–1	—
4	(Greece) Iraklis	4	2	0	2	5	7	−2	6		—	2–0	—	—	1–0
5	(Malta) Floriana	4	0	0	4	1	9	−8	0		0–1	—	1–2	—	—

Source: rsssf.com
21 June 1997

Merani-91 Tbilisi (Georgia (country))	0–2	(Russia) Torpedo Moscow
		Gashkin 5'; Mashkarin 54'

Boris Paichadze Stadium, Tbilisi
Attendance: 7,000
Referee: Loizos Loizou (Cyprus)

22 June 1997

Ried (Austria)	3–1	(Greece) Iraklis
Drechsel 39', 79'; Waldhör 69'		Semos 77'

Rieder Stadion, Ried im Innkreis
Attendance: 1,264
Referee: Ivan Dobrinov (Bulgaria)

28 June 1997

Floriana (Malta)	1–2	(Austria) Ried
Veselji 47'		Drechsel 23'; Angerschmid 67'

Victor Tedesco Stadium, Hamrun
Attendance: 404
Referee: Alan Snoddy (Northern Ireland)

29 June 1997

Iraklis (Greece)	2–0	(Georgia (country)) Merani-91 Tbilisi
Semos 52'; Wambamba 66'

Kaftanzoglio Stadium, Thessaloniki
Attendance: 259
Referee: Viorel Anghelinei (Romania)

5 July 1997

Merani-91 Tbilisi (Georgia (country))	5–0	(Malta) Floriana
Kvaratskhelia 58', 61'; Ambidze 67'; Maziashvili 74'; Davitashvili 79'

Boris Paichadze Stadium, Tbilisi
Referee: Metin Tokat (Turkey)

6 July 1997

Torpedo Moscow (Russia)	4–1	(Greece) Iraklis
Jankauskas 8'; Kamoltsev 54'; Khokhlov 64'; Preiksaitis 68'		Hantzidis 16'

Eduard Streltsov Stadium, Moscow
Attendance: 2,500
Referee: Marnix Sandra (Belgium)

12 July 1997

Floriana (Malta)	0–1	(Russia) Torpedo Moscow
		Botsiyev 44'

Independence Ground, Floriana
Attendance: 1,000
Referee: José Pratas (Portugal)

12 July 1997

Ried (Austria)	1–3	(Georgia (country)) Merani-91 Tbilisi
Hansen 40'		Maziashvili 8'; Goderdzishvili 17'; Kvaratskhelia 53'

Rieder Stadion, Ried im Innkreis
Attendance: 1,000
Referee: Sergejs Braga (Latvia)

19 July 1997

Iraklis (Greece)	1–0	(Malta) Floriana
Sapanis 14'

Kaftanzoglio Stadium, Thessaloniki
Attendance: 150
Referee: Dragan Radulović (FR Yugoslavia)

19 July 1997

Torpedo Moscow (Russia)	2–0	(Austria) Ried
Carlos Alberto 6' (pen.); Gashkin 13'

Eduard Streltsov Stadium, Moscow
Attendance: 3,000
Referee: Juha Hirviniemi (Finland)

== Semi-finals ==
=== Summary ===
Team 1	Agg.	Team 2	1st leg	2nd leg
Hamburg (Germany)	1–2	(France) Bastia	0–1	1–1 (a.e.t.)
İstanbulspor (Turkey)	2–3	(France) Lyon	2–1	0–2
Auxerre (France)	4–4 (a)	(Russia) Torpedo Moscow	3–0	1–4
Lokomotiv Nizhny Novgorod (Russia)	0–1	(Sweden) Halmstad	0–0	0–1
Köln (Germany)	2–2 (a)	(France) Montpellier	2–1	0–1
Dynamo Moscow (Russia)	3–5	(Germany) Duisburg	2–2	1–3

=== Matches ===
26 July 1997
16:00

Lokomotiv Nizhny Novgorod (Russia)	0–0	(Sweden) Halmstad
	Report

Lokomotiv Stadium, Nizhny Novgorod
Attendance: 6,900
Referee: Lutz Michael Fröhlich (Germany)
30 July 1997
19:00

Halmstad (Sweden)	1–0	(Russia) Lokomotiv Nizhny Novgorod
F. Andersson 24'	Report

Örjans Vall, Halmstad
Attendance: 2,329
Referee: Pascal Garibian (France)

Halmstad won 1–0 on aggregate.

26 July 1997
18:00

Hamburg (Germany)	0–1	(France) Bastia
	Report	Rool 65'

Volksparkstadion, Hamburg
Attendance: 16,663
Referee: Manuel Díaz Vega (Spain)
30 July 1997
20:00

Bastia (France)	1–1 (a.e.t.)	(Germany) Hamburg
Daye 114'	Report	Fischer 90'

Stade Armand Cesari, Bastia
Attendance: 2,500
Referee: Václav Krondl (Czech Republic)

Bastia won 2–1 on aggregate.

26 July 1997
20:00

İstanbulspor (Turkey)	2–1	(France) Lyon
Sergen 18'; Kocaman 26' (pen.)	Report	Caveglia 4'

BJK İnönü Stadium, Istanbul
Attendance: 18,392
Referee: Fernand Meese (Belgium)
30 July 1997
20:00

Lyon (France)	2–0	(Turkey) İstanbulspor
Cocard 8'; Giuly 75'	Report

Stade de Gerland, Lyon
Attendance: 20,000
Referee: Urs Meier (Switzerland)

Lyon won 3–2 on aggregate.

26 July 1997
21:00

Auxerre (France)	3–0	(Russia) Torpedo Moscow
Goma 43'; Diomède 58'; Marlet 64'	Report

Stade Abbé-Deschamps, Auxerre
Attendance: 5,000
Referee: Karol Ihring (Slovakia)
30 July 1997
17:00

Torpedo Moscow (Russia)	4–1	(France) Auxerre
Gashkin 23'; Mashkarin 36'; Samarone 50'; Carlos Alberto 88' (pen.)	Report	Guivarc'h 43'

Eduard Streltsov Stadium, Moscow
Attendance: 3,000
Referee: László Vagner Hungary)

4–4 on aggregate; Auxerre won on away goals.

27 July 1997
16:00

Dynamo Moscow (Russia)	2–2	(Germany) Duisburg
Teryokhin 18', 37'	Report	Osthoff 60'; Salou 64'

Central Dynamo Stadium, Moscow
Attendance: 5,000
Referee: Peter Mikkelsen (Denmark)
30 July 1997
19:15

Duisburg (Germany)	3–1	(Russia) Dynamo Moscow
Wohlert 9', 11'; Gill 89' (pen.)	Report	Kobelev 36'

Wedaustadion, Duisburg
Attendance: 8,650
Referee: David Elleray (England)

Duisburg won 5–3 on aggregate.

27 July 1997
19:00

Köln (Germany)	2–1	(France) Montpellier
Polster 8' (pen.); Schuster 47'	Report	Sauzée 69'

Müngersdorfer Stadion, Cologne
Attendance: 7,500
Referee: Alfredo Trentalange (Italy)
30 July 1997
20:45

Montpellier (France)	1–0	(Germany) Köln
Rouviere 24'	Report

Stade de la Mosson, Montpellier
Attendance: 4,877
Referee: Leif Sundell (Sweden)

2–2 on aggregate; Montpellier won on away goals.

== Finals ==
=== Summary ===
Team 1	Agg.	Team 2	1st leg	2nd leg
Montpellier (France)	2–4	(France) Lyon	0–1	2–3
Halmstad (Sweden)	1–2	(France) Bastia	0–1	1–1 (a.e.t.)
Duisburg (Germany)	0–2	(France) Auxerre	0–0	0–2

=== Matches ===
12 August 1997
19:00

Halmstad (Sweden)	0–1	(France) Bastia
	Report	Daye 46'

Örjans Vall, Halmstad
Attendance: 2,140
Referee: Ryszard Wójcik (Poland)
26 August 1997
20:00

Bastia (France)	1–1 (a.e.t.)	(Sweden) Halmstad
Soumah 113'	Report	Vougt 63'

Stade Armand Cesari, Bastia
Attendance: 8,000
Referee: Atanas Uzunov (Bulgaria)

Bastia won 2–1 on aggregate.

12 August 1997
20:20

Duisburg (Germany)	0–0	(France) Auxerre
	Report

Wedaustadion, Duisburg
Attendance: 9,350
Referee: Sándor Puhl (Hungary)
26 August 1997
21:00

Auxerre (France)	2–0	(Germany) Duisburg
Diomède 56'; Jeunechamp 83'	Report

Stade de l'Abbé-Deschamps, Auxerre
Attendance: 9,000
Referee: Anders Frisk (Sweden)

Auxerre won 2–0 on aggregate.

12 August 1997
20:45

Montpellier (France)	0–1	(France) Lyon
	Report	Baills 11' (o.g.)

Stade de la Mosson, Montpellier
Attendance: 5,078
Referee: Piero Ceccarini (Italy)
26 August 1997
20:00

Lyon (France)	3–2	(France) Montpellier
Laville 19'; Carteron 79'; Caveglia 90'	Report	Alicarte 48'; Bakayoko 61'

Stade de Gerland, Lyon
Attendance: 20,000
Referee: Markus Merk (Germany)

Lyon won 4–2 on aggregate.

== See also ==
- 1997–98 UEFA Champions League
- 1997–98 UEFA Cup Winners' Cup
- 1997–98 UEFA Cup
