= 1926–27 JBUs Mesterskabsrække =

JBUs Mesterskabsrække
- Season: 1926–27
- Dates: 12 September 1926 – 8 May 1927 (regular season); 12 May – 12 June 1927 (play-offs)
- Champions: Horsens FS (2nd title)
- Relegated: Horsens FS (reserves)
- Matches: 60
- Total number of matches and goals played does not include the promotion/relegation play-offs.

The 1926–27 JBUs Mesterskabsrække was the 29th season of the Jutland Football Championship since its establishment in 1902, and the 5th season since the regional top-flight league was rebranded and reorganised from JBUs A-Række to the JBUs Mesterskabsrække. The season was launched on 12 September 1926 and concluded on 8 May 1927 with the final match of the regular league fixtures, while the two-legged championship play-off and the promotion/relegation play-off matches were held between 15 May and 12 June 1927. Horsens FS secured their second consecutive Jutland league championship and qualified for both the provincial semi-finals of the 1926–27 Landsfodboldturneringen and the group stage of the 1927–28 Danmarksmesterskabsturneringen. Horsens FS' reserve team were relegated and replaced by Kolding BK of the 1926–27 JBUs A-række, who had won the regional second-tier league championship. In the 1926 JBUs Pokalturnering, Aalborg BK obtained their third consecutive cup championship, by winning the final against Esbjerg fB.

== Season summary ==
The board of Jutland Football Association made a decision to expand the league with six teams just a little over a month prior to the start of the season. Following a qualification cup tournament involving the eleven group winners of the 1925–26 JBUs A-række and the lowest placed team in the 1925–25 JBUs Mesterskabsrække played on 9 August 1926, BK Herning Fremad, Fredericia BK, IK Aalborg Freja, Holstebro BK and the reserve team of Horsens FS were promoted to regional top-flight league, while IK Aalborg Chang managed to secure another season in the league. The match schedules for the fall season for its 94 member clubs in three regional divisions, the Mesterskabsrækken (12 teams), A-ækken (42 teams) and B-rækken (81 teams), and in the regional cup tournament were published on 1 September 1926 by the Jutland FA, and involved a nearly 5 months long winter break from November 1926 to March 1927. The first fixtures of the season were played on 12 September 1926.

A hurricane hit Jutland on 10 October 1926 causing the league match between Holstebro BK and Aarhus GF at a ground in Holstebro to be cancelled after 15 minutes of attempts to keep playing, and the clubs agreed to continue playing at another date and time. The rescheduled match took place on 14 November 1926. The remaining league matches went on as scheduled. After the conclusion of the fall season, Viborg FF and IK Aalborg Freja was leading the north group's league table with 8 points, while Horsens FS was in first place in the south group.

Another storm on 24 April 1927 had a crucial impact on the game between Aarhus GF and IK Aalborg Freja at Aarhus Idrætspark, where one of the goals accredited to Aarhus GF was literally blown into the goal without the involvement of a foot and outside the reach of IK Aalborg Freja's goalkeeper Herman Christensen.

Following the league match between BK Herning Fremad and Vejle BK on 9 May 1927, the automobile, transporting six Vejle BK players back to Vejle from Herning, experienced a puncture at Holtum Bridge around 6 o'clock. Haulier Chr. Hansen lost control of his wagon, crashing it into a three by the road, causing a somersault, and completely destroying the automobile. All six players were injured, with five of them being able to leave Brande Hospital shortly after treatment, while Hans Sielemann had his right arm and hand crushed and was hospitalised.

== Teams ==
Twelve teams competed in the league split into two groups with each six teams – the six teams from the previous season and the six teams promoted from the second-tier. The promoted teams were the reserve team of Horsens FS, BK Herning Fremad, Fredericia BK, IK Aalborg Freja, IK Aalborg Chang and Holstebro BK.

=== Stadia and locations ===
Locations of the 1926–27 JBUs Mesterskabsrække teams.

Club	Location	Stadium
BK Herning Fremad	Herning	
Esbjerg fB	Esbjerg	
Fredericia BK	Fredericia	Fredericia Idrætspark
Holstebro BK	Holstebro	
Horsens FS	Horsens	Sportspladsen i Østergade
Horsens FS (reserves)	Horsens	Sportspladsen i Østergade
IK Aalborg Chang	Aalborg	Aalborg Stadium
IK Aalborg Freja	Aalborg	Aalborg Stadium
Vejle BK	Vejle	
Viborg FF	Viborg	Eksercerpladsen
Aalborg BK	Aalborg	Aalborg Stadium
Aarhus GF	Aarhus	Aarhus Idrætspark

== League tables ==
Every team in each group played two games against the other teams, at home and away, totaling 10 games each. Teams received two points for a win and one point for a draw. If two or more teams were tied on points, places were determined by head-to-head points and goal ratio. The team with the most points qualified for the championship play-offs, while the team with the fewest points in each group would qualify for the promotion/relegation play-offs.

=== Nordkredsen table ===
Pos	Team	Pld	W	D	L	GF	GA	GR	Pts	Promotion, qualification or relegation
1	Viborg FF	10	6	1	3	28	19	1.474	13	Qualification for the Championship play-offs & 1927–28 Danmarksmesterskabsturneringen
2	Aalborg BK	10	6	0	4	42	24	1.750	12 (Note: Aalborg BK finished equal on points with Aarhus GF and contested in a play-off match for a spot in the 1927–28 Danmarksmesterskabsturneringen.)	
3	Aarhus GF	10	6	0	4	26	23	1.130	12	Qualification for the 1927–28 Danmarksmesterskabsturneringen
4	IK Aalborg Freja	10	5	1	4	25	24	1.042	11	
5	Holstebro BK	10	3	1	6	19	30	0.633	7	
6	IK Aalborg Chang (O)	10	2	1	7	14	36	0.389	5	Qualification to the Promotion/relegation play-offs

Rules for classification: 1) Points; 2) Head-to-head points; 3) Goal ratio
(O) Play-off winners

=== Sydkredsen table ===
Pos	Team	Pld	W	D	L	GF	GA	GR	Pts	Promotion, qualification or relegation
1	Horsens FS (C)	10	7	2	1	34	15	2.267	16	Qualification for the Championship play-offs & 1927–28 Danmarksmesterskabsturneringen
2	Fredericia BK	10	7	1	2	33	14	2.357	15	Qualification for the 1927–28 Danmarksmesterskabsturneringen
3	Esbjerg fB	10	5	2	3	23	18	1.278	12	
4	Vejle BK	10	4	2	4	37	31	1.194	10	
5	BK Herning Fremad	10	1	2	7	21	46	0.457	4	
6	Horsens FS (reserves) (R)	10	1	1	8	17	43	0.395	3	Qualification to the Promotion/relegation play-offs

Rules for classification: 1) Points; 2) Head-to-head points; 3) Goal ratio
(C) Champions; (R) Relegated

== Results ==
=== Nordkredsen results ===
Home \ Away	AAB	AGF	AAF	VFF	AAC	HBK
Aalborg BK	—	8–2	2–4	5–3	8–2	4–2
Aarhus GF	3–2	—	3–1	0–3	5–0	5–1
IK Aalborg Freja	2–7	2–1	—	2–1	5–1	1–2
Viborg FF	0–3	2–0	4–2	—	5–3	6–3
IK Aalborg Chang	3–2	1–3	2–2	0–3	—	3–1
Holstebro BK	3–0	3–4	1–4	1–1	2–1	—

Legend: Blue = home team win; Yellow = draw; Red = away team win.

=== Sydkredsen results ===
Home \ Away	EFB	HFS	FBK	HF2	VBK	BHF
Esbjerg fB	—	2–2	1–0	6–0	4–4	3–1
Horsens FS	4–0	—	2–2	5–0	1–0	7–0
Fredericia BK	3–1	4–1	—	3–0	5–2	5–0
Horsens FS (reserves)	0–2	0–1	2–3	—	5–9	4–2
Vejle BK	1–3	2–3	3–1	6–1	—	5–2
BK Herning Fremad	3–1	2–6	3–5	4–4	5–5	—

Legend: Blue = home team win; Yellow = draw; Red = away team win.

== Championship play-offs ==
The finals were contested at neutral venues in Randers and Aarhus between the winners of the North and South groups, Viborg FF and Horsens FS and refereed by Copenhagen-based Sophus Hansen (BK Frem) and Lauritz Andersen (previously BK Velo). Both matches featured Horsens FS in yellow shirts, while Viborg FF were playing in blue shirts. The rules of the championship play-offs stated that at least a win and a tie (three points) was needed to obtain the Jutland Championship title, while a win to each team in the first and second match would result in a third replay match. By winning the championship play-offs, Horsens FS qualified for the provincial semi-finals of the 1926–27 Landsfodboldturneringen, while both teams were automatically qualified for the 1927–28 Danmarksmesterskabsturneringen.

15 May 1927
14:30 CET

Horsens FS	3–2	Viborg FF
Svend Aage Jacobsen 1'; Carl Jensen 72', 87'		Gustav Carstensen 25' (pen.); Arnold Thisted 42'

Randers Stadium, Randers
Attendance: 2,000
Referee: Sophus Hansen (BK Frem)

Horsens FS	Viborg FF

GK	Regnar Jensen
DF	A. Tungelund
DF	Emil Møller
MF	Svend Hansen (c)
MF	Viggo Sørensen
MF	Mikael Grønlund
FW	Viggo Mellerup
FW	Carl Jensen
FW	Svend Aage Jacobsen
FW	Niels Chr. Sørensen
FW	Sophus Bülow

GK	Aksel Pedersen
DF	Gustav Carstensen
DF	Magnus Sørensen
MF	William Rønning
MF	Valdemar Bodilsen (c)
MF	Ejnar Bilgrav
FW	Niels Holst
FW	Helmuth Weismose
FW	Arnold Thisted
FW	Casper Nielsen
FW	Axel "Star" Husted

22 May 1927
14:30 CET

Viborg FF	0–11	Horsens FS
		Carl Jensen 1h', 2h', 2h' Viggo Sørensen 1h', 1h', 2h', 2h', 2h', 2h' Niels Chr. Sørensen 2h' Viggo Mellerup 2h'

Aarhus Idrætspark, Aarhus
Attendance: 3,500
Referee: Lauritz Andersen (Copenhagen)

Viborg FF	Horsens FS

GK	Aksel Pedersen
DF	Gustav Carstensen
DF	Magnus Sørensen
MF	William Rønning
MF	Valdemar Bodilsen (c)
MF	Ejnar Bilgrav
FW	Niels Holst
FW	Helmuth Weismose
FW	Arnold Thisted
FW	Casper Nielsen
FW	Axel "Star" Husted

GK	Regnar Jensen
DF	A. Tungelund
DF	Emil Møller
MF	Svend Hansen (c)
MF	Svend Aage Jacobsen
MF	Mikael Grønlund
FW	Viggo Mellerup
FW	Carl Jensen
FW	Viggo Sørensen
FW	Niels Chr. Sørensen
FW	Sophus Bülow

Match rules

- 90 minutes.
- Horsens FS are champions if match is won or drawn.
- Replay match if Viborg FF wins.
- No substitutes.

== Promotion/relegation play-offs ==
IK Aalborg Chang and Horsens FS (reserves) finished last in their respective groups and hence had to contest in play-off matches for their spots in the 1927–28 JBUs Mesterskabsrække. Kolding BK qualified to the play-offs by winning their JBUs A-række south group final match on 22 May 1927 against Vejen SF with 2–0, while Randers SK Chang secured a victory against Ry BK in their JBUs A-række north group final match. Randers SK Chang's line-up for the match was composed of Pind (goalkeeper) – Heron Sørensen, Evald Larsen (defenders) – Carl Emil Sørensen, Valdemar Hansen, Kaj Christensen (midfielders) – Petrus Milwertz, C. Holting, Keill, H. Broberg and Willy Hansen (forwards). IK Aalborg Chang's line-up consisted of Erik Bratten (goalkeeper) – Ingvald Petersen, captain Tom Nielsen (defenders) – Ejner Thomsen, Oscar Jensen, Aage Larsen (midfielders) – Jens Anker Arentoft, Fritz Jensen, Kaj "Mester" Eriksen, Baldus Buus and K. E. Christiansen (forwards), which was different from the team's main line-up due to sick leaves. Horsens fS reserves's reinforced line-up featured Jerichau (goalkeeper) – Kaj Kleine, Emborg (defenders) - Hartvig Petersen, Herluf Petersen, Mar. Hansen (midfielders) – Viggo Mellerup, Sigvald Sørensen, Børge Beck, Victor Hansen and Henry Jacobsen (forwards). The team of Kolding BK included P. Wergeltoft (goalkeeper), Emil Hansen, Skøtt, Knudsen, Ravn, Arne Hansen, "Smeden" and Jeppesen in their squad.

IK Aalborg Chang won their play-off match, refereed by Sophus Petersen of Horsens, against Randers SK Chang and retained its Mesterskabsrække spot for the next season, but the reserve team of Horsens FS lost against Kolding BK, replacing each other in the regional top-flight league and second tier division. Kolding Boldklub had secured the overall 1926–27 JBUs A-række Football Championship by winning the final match against Randers Sportsklub Chang on 29 May 1927. The promotion/relegation play-off matches were contested at Randers Stadium and at a neutral venue in Vejle Idrætspark on 12 June 1927.

12 June 1927
13:30 CET

Randers SK Chang	1–7	IK Aalborg Chang
H. Broberg 1h'		Oscar Jensen 11'; Kaj "Mester" Eriksen 18', 1h', 2h' Jens Anker Arentoft 1h' Baldus Buus 1h' K. E. Christiansen 2h'

Randers Stadium, Randers
Attendance: 850
Referee: Sophus Petersen (Horsens)
12 June 1927
14:00 CET

Horsens FS (reserves)	1–3	Kolding BK
Viggo Mellerup 2h'		? Knudsen 25' ? Ravn 2h', 2h'

Vejle Idrætspark, Vejle
Attendance: 600
Referee: Frede Højmark (Aarhus)

== Play-off for Danmarksmesterskabsturneringen ==
The two runners-up in the league's northern group, Aarhus GF and the 1926 defending cup champions Aalborg BK, faced each other in a qualifier for a spot among the four Jutland FA participants in the 1927–28 Danmarksmesterskabsturneringen due to finishing the season with the same number of points. The play-off game was refereed by Sophus Hansen (affiliated with BK Frem), attended by 1,500 spectators at Randers Stadium and was won by Aarhus GF. The Danish FA had predetermined that the play-off winner would play in the tournament's group 2.

21 August 1927
13:45 CET

Aarhus GF	4–2	Aalborg BK
Thorkild Jørgensen 11', 29', 53'; Frimodt Jørgensen 69'		Kaj Mølback 40'; Søren Andersen 72' (pen.)

Randers Stadium, Randers
Attendance: 1,500
Referee: Sophus Hansen (BK Frem)
