= Alicarte =

Alicarte is a surname. Notable people with the surname include:

- Bruno Alicarte (born 1972), French footballer
- Hervé Alicarte (born 1974), French footballer, brother of Bruno

== See also ==
- Alicante
