= 1926 JBUs Pokalturnering =

1926 JBU Cup

Tournament details
- Country: Denmark
- Venue: Ringkjøbing
- Dates: 22 August – 21 November 1926
- Teams: 29

Final positions
- Champions: Aalborg BK (3rd title)
- Runners-up: Esbjerg fB

Tournament statistics
- Matches played: 28
- Total matches and goals scored include replays and scheduled games

The 1926 JBUs Pokalturnering (Unofficial English translation: 1926 JBU Cup, 1926 Jutland Cup) was the 3rd edition of the regional tournament, JBUs Pokalturnering, the highest senior cup competition organised by the Jutland FA (JBU). The tournament was held in the third and fourth quarter of 1926 with Aalborg BK as the defending cup champions. The season was launched on 22 August 1926 with the first round, embraced five cup rounds and concluded on 21 November 1926 with the cup final. A total of 29 clubs participated in the cup tournament, which was the same number of teams as the previous season.

Aalborg BK won the cup tournament for the third consecutive time, by winning the final on 21 November 1926 in Ringkjøbing against regional top-flight league rivals Esbjerg fB. The cup final was a repeat of the last season's cup final in Vejle. Aalborg BK outscored their opponents 33–6 on aggregate in the five games played in this year's competition, while Esbjerg fB reached the final in four games due to a bye in the second round.

== Participants ==
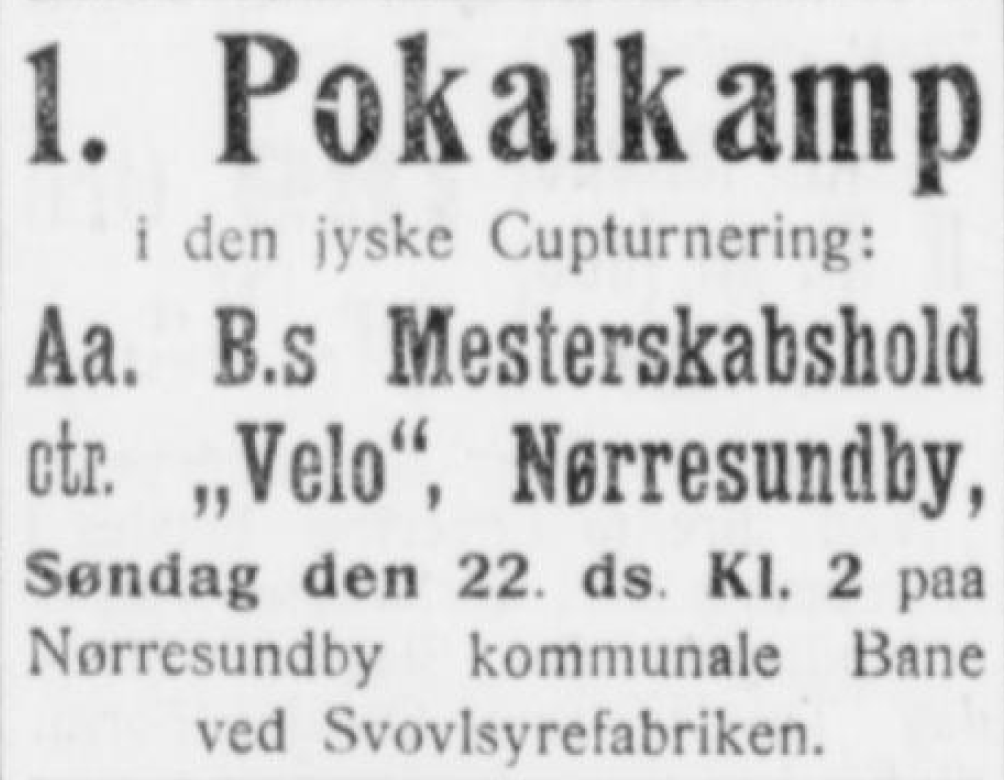
Newspaper advertisement for the first round cup game 22 August 1926 between BK Velo Nørresundby and Aalborg BK, played in Nørresundby.

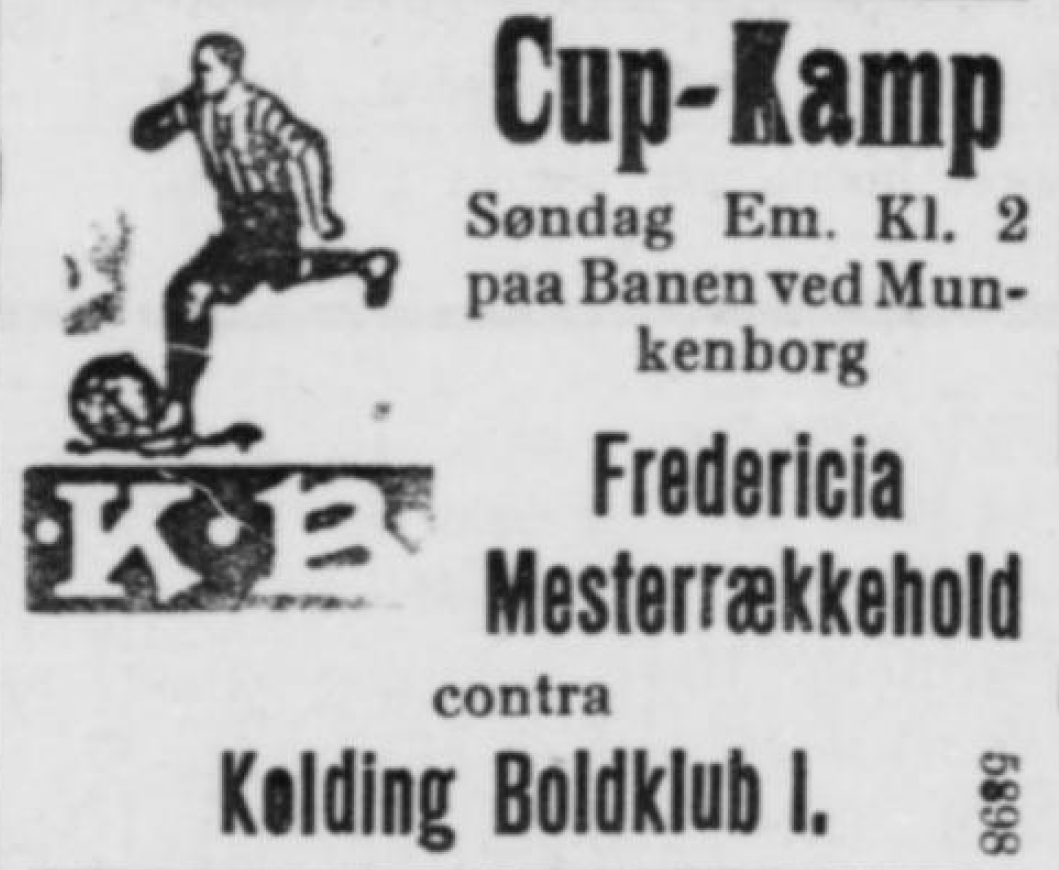
Newspaper advertisement for the match on 22 August 1926 between Kolding BK and Fredericia BK.

The following 29 senior teams from the Jutland FA's then three tier league system, 1925–26 JBUs Mesterskabsrække (3 clubs), the 1925–26 JBUs A-række (23 clubs) and the 1925–26 JBUs B-række (3 clubs), signed up for the cup tournament. From the JBUs Mesterskabsrække, Aarhus GF and Vejle BK did not take part in this season – Aarhus GF redrew their original registration due to the new format of the regional top-flight league, while Vejle BK was of the opinion that the costs were too large in relation to the significance and interest of the cup matches. Horsens FS participated with their reserve team, that had been promoted to the 1926–27 JBUs Mesterskabsrække, and not the first senior team.

Team	Last season's league position
Aalborg BK	Runners-up of the 1925–26 JBUs Mesterskabsrække
Viborg FF	3rd place of the 1925–26 JBUs Mesterskabsrække
IK Aalborg Chang	5th place of the 1925–26 JBUs Mesterskabsrække
IK Aalborg Freja	Winners of group 1 and division winners of the 1925–26 JBUs A-række
Randers SK Freja	Runners-up of the 1925–26 JBUs A-række, group 1
Frederikshavn IF 1900	4th place of the 1925–26 JBUs A-række, group 1
Grenaa IF	Winners of the 1925–26 JBUs A-række, group 2
Randers SK Chang	4th place of the 1925–26 JBUs A-række, group 2
Arbejdernes IK Aarhus	Winners of the 1925–26 JBUs A-række, group 3
Aarhus IF 1900	3rd place of the 1925–26 JBUs A-række, group 3
Viby IF	4th place of the 1925–26 JBUs A-række, group 3
Horsens FS (reserves)	Winners of the 1925–26 JBUs A-række, group 4
Ry SK	3rd place of the 1925–26 JBUs A-række, group 4
Fredericia BK	Winners of the 1925–26 JBUs A-række, group 5
Kolding IF	Runners-up of the 1925–26 JBUs A-række, group 5
Kolding BK	3rd place of the 1925–26 JBUs A-række, group 5
ØB Fredericia	4th place of the 1925–26 JBUs A-række, group 5
Vejen SF	Winners of the 1925–26 JBUs A-række, group 6
Esbjerg fB	Winners of group 8 and division runners-up of the 1925–26 JBUs A-række
Varde GF	4th place of the 1925–26 JBUs A-række, group 8
BK Herning Fremad	Winners of the 1925–26 JBUs A-række, group 9
Brande IF	Runners-up of the 1925–26 JBUs A-række, group 9
Silkeborg IF	3rd place of the 1925–26 JBUs A-række, group 9
Holstebro BK	Winners of the 1925–26 JBUs A-række, group 10
Skive IK	Runners-up of the 1925–26 JBUs A-række, group 10
Thisted IK	Winners of the 1925–26 JBUs A-række, group 11
BK Velo Nørresundby	Winners of the 1925–26 JBUs B-række, group 13
B 1921 Aarhus	Winners of the 1925–26 JBUs B-række, group 21
Kjellerup fS	Winners of the 1925–26 JBUs B-række, group 34

== Matches ==
=== Bracket ===
First round proper
22 August 1926
Kolding BK	3
Fredericia BK	0
22 August 1926
Vejen SF	3
Kolding IF	2
22 August 1926
ØB Fredericia	2
Horsens FS (reserves)	5
22 August 1926
Silkeborg IF	2
Viby IF	6
22 August 1926
Ry SK
BK Herning Fremad
22 August 1926
Varde GF	3
Esbjerg fB	10
22 August 1926
Thisted IK	2
Holstebro BK	4
22 August 1926
Aarhus IF 1900	2
Kjellerup fS	4
22 August 1926
Skive IK	1
Viborg FF	6
22 August 1926
Randers SK Freja	6
IK Aalborg Chang	3
22 August 1926
Arbejdernes IK, Aarhus	0
Randers SK Chang	2
22 August 1926
Grenaa IF (a.e.t.)	4
B 1921 Aarhus	3
22 August 1926
BK Velo Nørresundby	0
Aalborg BK	5
22 August 1926
Frederikshavn IF 1900	3
IK Aalborg Freja	2

Second round proper
5 September 1926
Kolding BK	5
Vejen SF	1
5 September 1926
Horsens FS (reserves)	1
Viby IF	0
5 September 1926
BK Herning Fremad	7
Brande IF	1
5 September 1926
Kjellerup fS	0
Holstebro BK	8
5 September 1926
Viborg FF	4
Randers SK Freja	2
5 September 1926
Randers SK Chang	3
Grenaa IF	0
5 September 1926
Aalborg BK	11
Frederikshavn IF 1900	2

Quarter-finals
7 November 1926
Horsens FS (reserves)	1
Kolding BK	5
7 November 1926
Esbjerg fB	8
BK Herning Fremad	1
7 November 1926
Holstebro BK	0
Viborg FF	1
7 November 1926
Randers SK Chang	0
Aalborg BK	4

Semi-finals
14 November 1926
Esbjerg fB	4
Kolding BK	3
14 November 1926
Viborg FF	1
Aalborg BK	8

Cup Final
21 November 1926
Aalborg BK	5
Esbjerg fB	3

=== First round proper ===
The first round proper of the cup tournament was played on Sunday, 22 August 1926 in 13 different cities. No Aarhus-based club progressed to the next round. The draw for the first round by the Jutland FA took place on 13 August 1926. Brande IF received a bye to the second round.

22 August 1926	BK Velo Nørresundby	0–5	Aalborg BK	Nørresundby
14:00 CET				Stadium: Kommunale Sportsplads ved Svovlsyrefabrikken

22 August 1926	Randers SK Freja	6–3	IK Aalborg Chang	Randers
14:00 CET	I. C. "Slagteren" Madsen 1h' Hearley 30', 48', 75'; O. Berthelsen 1h', 53'		? 1'; Eigil Larsen 65', 6?'	Stadium: Randers Stadium; Attendance: Vilhelm Jørgensen (B 1903)

22 August 1926	Frederikshavn IF 1900	3–2	IK Aalborg Freja	Frederikshavn

22 August 1926	Thisted IK	2–4	Holstebro BK	Thisted
14:00 CET				Stadium: Vestre Dyrskueplads

22 August 1926	Skive IK	1–6	Viborg FF	Skive
	? 1h' (pen.)		Helmuth Weismose ?h', ?h', ?h' (pen.); Gustav Karstensen ?h' A. Thisted ?h' Kasper ?h' Gustav Karstensen (red card)	Referee: Tolstrup (Aarhus)

22 August 1926	Grenaa IF	4–3 (a.e.t.)	B 1921 Aarhus	Grenaa

22 August 1926	Arbejdernes IK Aarhus	0–2	Randers SK Chang	Aarhus
14:00 CET				Stadium: AGFs Bane ved Ringgaden

22 August 1926	Ry SK	v	BK Herning Fremad	Ry

22 August 1926	Aarhus IF 1900	2–4	Kjellerup fS	Aarhus
13:30 CET				Stadium: Aarhus Idrætspark

22 August 1926	Silkeborg IF	2–6	Viby IF	Silkeborg

22 August 1926	ØB Fredericia	2–5	Horsens FS (reserves)	Fredericia
14:00 CET	Gunnar Holm 2h', 2h'		? 1h', 1h', 1h', 1h', 2h'	Stadium: Sportspladsen; Referee: M. Hansen

22 August 1926	Kolding BK	3–0	Fredericia BK	Kolding
14:00 CET	? 1h' "Kloksmeden" 1h' W. Skjøtt 85'			Stadium: Banen ved Munkenborg

22 August 1926	Varde GF	3–10	Esbjerg fB	Varde
	? ?h', ?h', ?h'		Niels Petersen ?h', ?h', ?h', ?h', ?h' Mejlvang ?h', ?h', ?h' Otto Nørgaard ?h', ?h'	Stadium: Frimurerhaven

22 August 1926	Vejen SF	3–2	Kolding IF	Vejen
14:30 CET	Chr. Pedersen 2h' R. Gaarde 2h', 2h'		? 1h' ? 1h' (pen.)	Stadium: Vejen Sportsplads; Referee: Niels Daugaard

Brande IF	bye

=== Second round proper ===
The initial match schedule for the regional cup tournament was published on 1 September 1926 by the Jutland FA. The matches in the second round was scheduled for Sunday, 5 September 1926. Esbjerg fB received a bye to the third round.

5 September 1926	Horsens FS (reserves)	1–0	Viby IF	Horsens
14:00 CET				Stadium: Sportspladsen i Østergade

5 September 1926	Viborg FF	4–2	Randers SK Freja	Viborg

5 September 1926	Aalborg BK	11–2	Frederikshavn IF 1900	Aalborg

5 September 1926	BK Herning Fremad	7–1	Brande IF	Herning

5 September 1926	Kolding BK	5–1	Vejen SF	Kolding

5 September 1926	Kjellerup fS	0–8	Holstebro BK	Kjellerup

5 September 1926	Randers SK Chang	3–0	Grenaa IF	Randers

Esbjerg fB	bye

=== Quarter-finals ===
The matches in the quarterfinals were originally scheduled to be played on 26 September 1926, but were moved several weeks to 7 November 1926.

7 November 1926	Horsens FS (reserves)	1–5	Kolding BK	Horsens

7 November 1926	Esbjerg fB	8–1	BK Herning Fremad	Esbjerg

7 November 1926	Holstebro BK	0–1	Viborg FF	Holstebro

7 November 1926	Randers SK Chang	0–4	Aalborg BK	Randers
				Stadium: Randers Stadium

=== Semi-finals ===
The semi-finals were both played on 14 November 1926.

14 November 1926	Viborg FF	1–8	Aalborg BK	Viborg
				Stadium: Viborgs bane

14 November 1926	Esbjerg fB	4–3	Kolding BK	Esbjerg
13:30 CET				Stadium: Banen ved Hjertingvejen

=== Cup Final ===
==== Match summary ====
The cup final was a repeat of the last season's cup final featuring the same teams and was played on Ringkjøbing IFs Bane in Ringkjøbing on 21 November 1926. The entire match was plagued by rain, which affected the game on the field and the attendance figures. The line-up of Aalborg BK consisted of one reserve player as replacement for the regular half back, Egon Thon. Esbjerg fB featured the same line-up, that had played in the club's semi-final match, with the exception that Niels Pedersen was included as right innerwing in the squad instead of Magnus Hansen, that was injured.

15 minutes into the first half, Aalborg BK's Alex Willadsen was injured to his knee, but was able to resume playing. Aalborg BK netted four goals (one being scored via penalty kick) and dominated the first half, while Esbjerg fB was the constant attacking part, scored the most goals in the second half. For the third consecutive year, Aalborg BK secured the cup championship in the JBUs Pokalturnering by winning the match 5–3 against league rivals Esbjerg fB – the trophy had to be won a total of five times for a club to obtain it permanently.

==== Match details ====
21 November 1926

Aalborg BK	5–3	Esbjerg fB
? 1h', 1h', 1h', 1h' (pen.); Alex Willadsen 8?'		Mathiasen 1h' Mejlvang 2h', 2h'

Ringkjøbing IFs home ground, Ringkjøbing
Referee: Frede Højmark (Aarhus)
