= KRC Genk in European football =

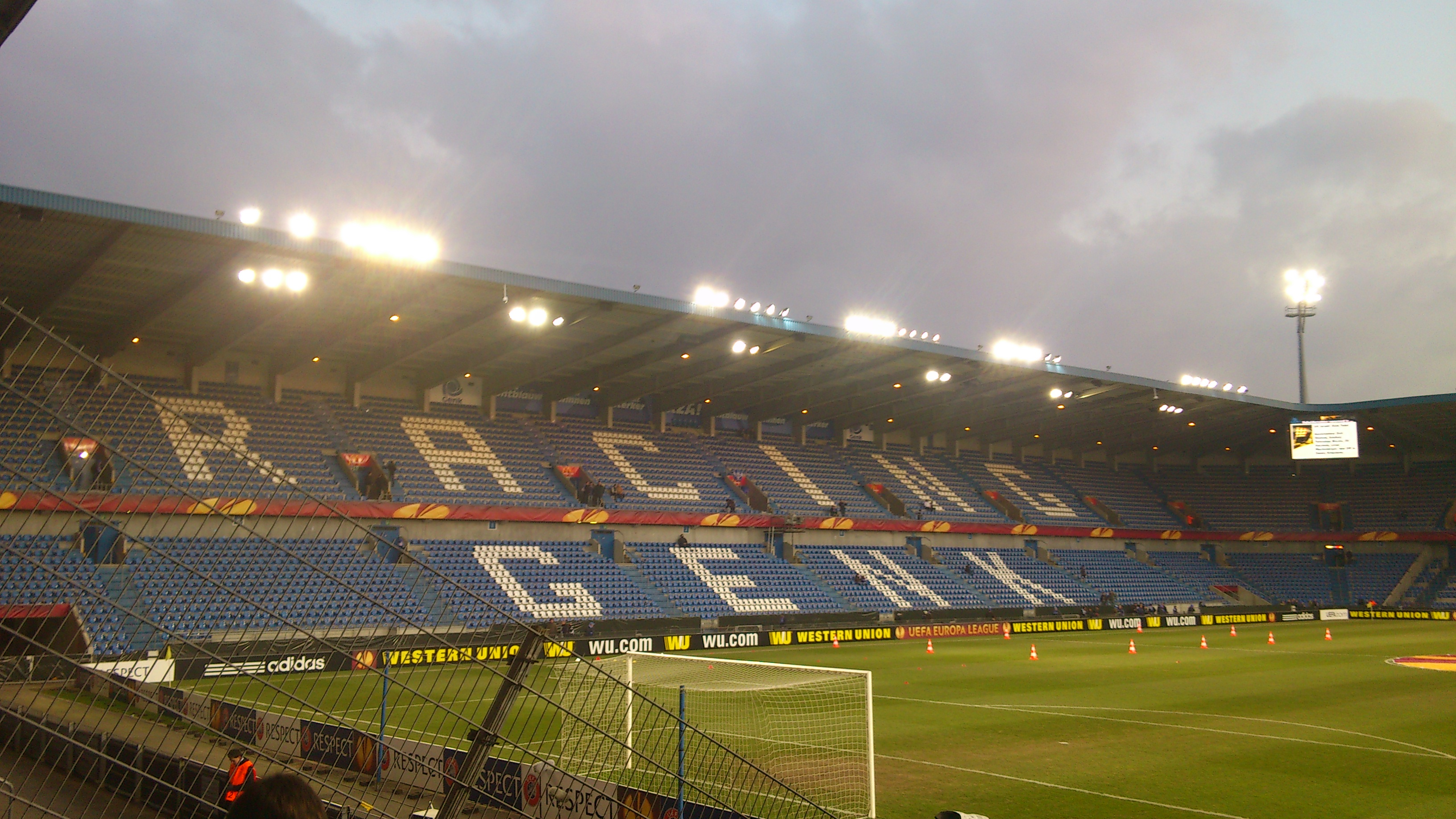
Luminus Arena, Genk's home ground.

Koninklijke Racing Club Genk is an association football club from Genk, Belgium. The team has participated in thirteen seasons of Union of European Football Associations (UEFA) club competitions, including four seasons in the Champions League, six seasons in the UEFA Cup and Europa League, two seasons in the Intertoto Cup and one season in the Cup Winners' Cup. It has played 74 UEFA games, resulting in 32 wins, 20 draws and 22 defeats. The club's first appearance was in the 1997 Intertoto Cup. Since then, Genk has been involved in a UEFA tournament every season except the 2001–02, the 2006–07 and the 2008–09 seasons. The club's best performance is reaching the group stage of the 2002–03 Champions League, the 2011–12 Champions League and the 2019–20 Champions League.

The club plays its home matches at Cegeka Arena, a multi-purpose stadium in Genk. Since the building in 1999, it can host 25,000 spectators (of which 4,200 are standing places).

The club was formed in 1988 by the merger of Waterschei Thor with KFC Winterslag, inheriting Winterslag's matricule number. Waterschei had appeared in the Cup-Winners Cup twice, in 1980–81 and again in 1982–83. Winterslag had appeared once in the UEFA Cup, in 1981–82.

== European record ==
=== Matches ===
- Q = qualification round
- PO = play-off
- KPO = knockout play-off
- R = round
- Group = group stage / Group 1 / League stage = first group stage / Group 2 = second group stage
- PUC = points UEFA coefficient

Season	Competition	Round	Opponent	Home	Away	Aggregate
1997	UEFA Intertoto Cup	Group	(Faroe Islands) B36 Tórshavn	—N/a	5–0	2nd
1997	UEFA Intertoto Cup	Group	(Norway) Stabæk	4–3	—N/a	2nd
1997	UEFA Intertoto Cup	Group	(Russia) Dynamo Moscow	—N/a	2–3	2nd
1997	UEFA Intertoto Cup	Group	(Greece) Panachaiki	4–2	—N/a	2nd
1998–99	Cup Winners' Cup	Q	(Albania) Apolonia	4–0	5–1	9–1
1998–99	Cup Winners' Cup	1R	(Germany) MSV Duisburg	5–0	1–1	6–1
1998–99	Cup Winners' Cup	2R	(Spain) Mallorca	1–1	0–0	1–1 (a)
1999–00	Champions League	2Q	(Slovenia) Maribor	3–0	1–5	4–5
2000–01	UEFA Cup	1R	(Switzerland) Zürich	2–1	1–0	3–1
2000–01	UEFA Cup	2R	(Germany) Werder Bremen	2–5	1–4	3–9
2002–03	Champions League	3Q	(Czech Republic) Sparta Prague	2–0	2–4	4–4 (a)
2002–03	Champions League	Group C	(Greece) AEK Athens	0–0	1–1	4th
2002–03	Champions League	Group C	(Spain) Real Madrid	1–1	0–6	4th
2002–03	Champions League	Group C	(Italy) Roma	0–1	0–0	4th
2004	UEFA Intertoto Cup	2R	(Bulgaria) Marek Dupnitza	2–1	0–0	2–1
2004	UEFA Intertoto Cup	3R	(Germany) Borussia Dortmund	0–1	2–1	2–2 (a)
2004	UEFA Intertoto Cup	Semi-finals	(Portugal) União de Leiria	0–0	0–2	0–2
2005–06	UEFA Cup	2Q	(Latvia) Liepājas Metalurgs	3–0	3–2	6–2
2005–06	UEFA Cup	1R	(Bulgaria) Litex Lovech	0–1	2–2	2–3
2007–08	Champions League	2Q	(Bosnia and Herzegovina) Sarajevo	1–2	1–0	2–2 (a)
2009–10	Europa League	PO	(France) Lille	1–2	2–4	3–6
2010–11	Europa League	3Q	(Finland) Inter Turku	3–2	5–1	8–3
2010–11	Europa League	PO	(Portugal) Porto	0–3	2–4	2–7
2011–12	Champions League	3Q	(Serbia) Partizan	2–1	1–1	3–2
2011–12	Champions League	PO	(Israel) Maccabi Haifa	2–1 (a.e.t.)	1–2	3–3 (4–1 p)
2011–12	Champions League	Group E	(Germany) Bayer Leverkusen	1–1	0–2	4th
2011–12	Champions League	Group E	(England) Chelsea	1–1	0–5	4th
2011–12	Champions League	Group E	(Spain) Valencia	0–0	0–7	4th
2012–13	Europa League	3Q	(Kazakhstan) Aktobe	2–1	2–1	4–2
2012–13	Europa League	PO	(Switzerland) Luzern	2–0	1–2	3–2
2012–13	Europa League	Group G	(Portugal) Sporting CP	2–1	1–1	1st
2012–13	Europa League	Group G	(Switzerland) Basel	0–0	2–2	1st
2012–13	Europa League	Group G	(Hungary) Videoton	3–0	1–0	1st
2012–13	Europa League	Round of 32	(Germany) VfB Stuttgart	0–2	1–1	1–3
2013–14	Europa League	PO	(Iceland) FH	2–0	5–2	7–2
2013–14	Europa League	Group G	(Ukraine) Dynamo Kyiv	3–1	1–0	1st
2013–14	Europa League	Group G	(Austria) Rapid Wien	1–1	2–2	1st
2013–14	Europa League	Group G	(Switzerland) Thun	2–1	1–0	1st
2013–14	Europa League	Round of 32	(Russia) Anzhi Makhachkala	0–2	0–0	0–2
2016–17	Europa League	2Q	(Montenegro) Budućnost Podgorica	2–0	0–2 (a.e.t.)	2–2 (4–2 p)
2016–17	Europa League	3Q	(Republic of Ireland) Cork City	1–0	2–1	3–1
2016–17	Europa League	PO	(Croatia) Lokomotiva	2–0	2–2	4–2
2016–17	Europa League	Group F	(Spain) Athletic Bilbao	2–0	3–5	1st
2016–17	Europa League	Group F	(Austria) Rapid Wien	1–0	2–3	1st
2016–17	Europa League	Group F	(Italy) Sassuolo	3–1	2–0	1st
2016–17	Europa League	Round of 32	(Romania) Astra Giurgiu	1–0	2–2	3–2
2016–17	Europa League	Round of 16	(Belgium) Gent	1–1	5–2	6–3
2016–17	Europa League	Quarter-finals	(Spain) Celta Vigo	1–1	2–3	3–4
2018–19	Europa League	2Q	(Luxembourg) Fola Esch	5–0	4–1	9–1
2018–19	Europa League	3Q	(Poland) Lech Poznań	2–0	2–1	4–1
2018–19	Europa League	PQ	(Denmark) Brøndby	5–2	4–2	9–4
2018–19	Europa League	Group I	(Sweden) Malmö FF	2–0	2–2	1st
2018–19	Europa League	Group I	(Norway) Sarpsborg 08	4–0	0–2	1st
2018–19	Europa League	Group I	(Turkey) Beşiktaş	1–1	4–2	1st
2018–19	Europa League	Round of 32	(Czech Republic) Slavia Prague	1–4	0–0	1–4
2019–20	Champions League	Group E	(Austria) Red Bull Salzburg	1–4	2–6	4th
2019–20	Champions League	Group E	(Italy) Napoli	0–0	0–4	4th
2019–20	Champions League	Group E	(England) Liverpool	1–4	1–2	4th
2021–22	Champions League	3Q	(Ukraine) Shakhtar Donetsk	1–2	1–2	2–4
2021–22	Europa League	Group H	(Croatia) Dinamo Zagreb	0–3	1–1	4th
2021–22	Europa League	Group H	(England) West Ham United	2–2	0–3	4th
2021–22	Europa League	Group H	(Austria) Rapid Wien	0–1	1–0	4th
2023–24	Champions League	2Q	(Switzerland) Servette	2–2 (a.e.t.)	1–1	3–3 (1–4 p)
2023–24	Europa League	3Q	(Greece) Olympiacos	1–1	0–1	1–2
2023–24	Europa Conference League	PO	(Turkey) Adana Demirspor	2–1	0–1 (a.e.t.)	2–2 (5–4 p)
2023–24	Europa Conference League	Group F	(Italy) Fiorentina	2–2	2–1	3rd
2023–24	Europa Conference League	Group F	(Serbia) Čukarički	2–0	0–2	3rd
2023–24	Europa Conference League	Group F	(Hungary) Ferencváros	0–0	1–1	3rd
2025–26	Europa League	PO	(Poland) Lech Poznań	1–2	5–1	6–3
2025–26	Europa League	League phase	(Scotland) Rangers	—N/a	1–0	9th
2025–26	Europa League	League phase	(Hungary) Ferencváros	0–1	—N/a	9th
2025–26	Europa League	League phase	(Spain) Real Betis	0–0	—N/a	9th
2025–26	Europa League	League phase	(Portugal) Braga	—N/a	4–3	9th
2025–26	Europa League	League phase	(Switzerland) Basel	2–1	—N/a	9th
2025–26	Europa League	League phase	(Denmark) Midtjylland	—N/a	0–1	9th
2025–26	Europa League	League phase	(Netherlands) Utrecht	—N/a	2–0	9th
2025–26	Europa League	League phase	(Sweden) Malmö FF	2–1	—N/a	9th
2025–26	Europa League	KPO	(Croatia) Dinamo Zagreb	3–3 (a.e.t.)	3–1	6–4
2025–26	Europa League	Round of 16	(Germany) SC Freiburg	1–0	1–5	2–5

== All-time statistics ==
The following is a list of the all-time statistics from Genk's games in the four UEFA tournaments it has participated in, as well as the overall total. The list contains the tournament, the number of games played (Pld), won (W), drawn (D) and lost (L). The number of goals scored (GF), goals against (GA), goal difference (GD) and the percentage of matches won (Win%). The statistics include qualification matches and is up to date as of the 2018–19 season. The statistics also include goals scored during the extra time where applicable; in these games, the result given is the result at the end of extra time.

Tournament	Pld	W	D	L	GF	GA	GD	Win%
Champions League / European Cup	22	5	8	9	20	41	−21	22.73
Europa League / UEFA Cup	60	34	12	14	117	80	+37	56.67
Cup Winners' Cup	6	3	3	0	16	3	+13	50.00
UEFA Intertoto Cup	10	5	2	3	19	13	+6	50.00
Total	98	47	25	26	172	137	+35	47.96
