= 1996–97 Austrian Football Bundesliga =

79th season of top-tier football league in Austria

Austrian Bundesliga
- Season: 1996–97
- Champions: SV Austria Salzburg

Statistics of Austrian Football Bundesliga in the 1996–97 season.

== Overview ==
It was contested by 10 teams, and SV Austria Salzburg won the championship.

=== Teams and location ===
Location of teams in the 1996–97 Austrian Football Bundesliga

Teams of 1996–97 Austrian Football Bundesliga

- FC Admira/Wacker
- Austria Salzburg
- Austria Wien
- Grazer AK
- LASK
- FC Linz
- Rapid Wien
- SV Ried
- Sturm Graz
- Tirol Innsbruck

== League standings ==
Pos	Team	Pld	W	D	L	GF	GA	GD	Pts	Qualification or relegation
1	Austria Salzburg (C)	36	19	12	5	54	25	+29	69	Qualification to Champions League second qualifying round
2	Rapid Wien	36	18	12	6	69	36	+33	66	Qualification to UEFA Cup second qualifying round
3	Sturm Graz	36	14	13	9	50	31	+19	55	Qualification to Cup Winners' Cup first round
4	Tirol Innsbruck	36	16	7	13	49	40	+9	55	Qualification to UEFA Cup second qualifying round
5	Grazer AK	36	11	14	11	39	42	−3	47	Qualification to Intertoto Cup group stage
6	Austria Wien	36	12	10	14	41	51	−10	46	Qualification to Intertoto Cup group stage
7	LASK Linz	36	9	17	10	38	47	−9	44	
8	Ried	36	12	6	18	44	59	−15	42	Qualification to Intertoto Cup group stage
9	FC Linz (R)	36	6	13	17	30	47	−17	31	Merged with LASK Linz after the season
10	Admira/Wacker (O)	36	6	10	20	35	71	−36	28	Qualification for relegation play-offs

Source: weltfussball.de (in German)
(C) Champions; (O) Play-off winners; (R) Relegated

== Results ==
Teams played each other four times in the league. In the first half of the season each team played every other team twice (home and away), and then did the same in the second half of the season.

=== First half of season ===
Home \ Away	ADM	ASZ	AWI	FCL	GAK	LIN	RIE	RWI	STU	TIR
Admira/Wacker		1–1	3–0	0–1	2–2	1–2	2–1	0–2	0–3	2–2
Austria Salzburg	1–0		3–1	0–2	1–0	1–1	3–0	1–1	1–0	1–0
Austria Wien	1–0	0–4		2–0	2–1	1–2	1–0	0–2	3–2	2–1
FC Linz	1–1	0–1	0–1		2–1	0–0	0–4	0–1	0–3	3–0
Grazer AK	3–0	0–0	2–2	1–0		3–1	1–0	1–1	2–2	1–1
LASK Linz	1–1	1–1	1–0	0–0	2–1		0–0	3–0	3–1	1–3
Ried	0–1	0–4	3–2	4–1	2–1	2–0		3–3	1–2	1–2
Rapid Wien	4–1	2–0	1–1	0–0	4–0	3–1	6–0		3–1	4–2
Sturm Graz	1–3	0–0	4–1	1–1	0–0	0–0	3–0	0–0		0–1
Tirol Innsbruck	1–1	0–1	1–1	2–0	3–0	2–0	4–0	1–1	2–0	

Source: weltfussball.de (in German)
Legend: Blue = home team win; Yellow = draw; Red = away team win.

=== Second half of season ===
Home \ Away	ADM	ASZ	AWI	FCL	GAK	LIN	RIE	RWI	STU	TIR
Admira/Wacker		1–1	3–2	0–3	1–2	1–3	3–1	1–2	0–2	0–1
Austria Salzburg	4–0		1–0	2–0	3–1	6–2	4–2	2–0	0–0	2–1
Austria Wien	2–1	3–1		2–0	1–1	1–1	2–1	0–0	0–1	1–0
FC Linz	2–2	2–2	1–1		0–1	3–0	2–2	1–1	0–0	0–1
Grazer AK	1–1	1–0	0–0	1–1		1–1	1–0	1–0	1–1	2–1
LASK Linz	2–2	0–0	2–2	1–1	1–0		3–0	1–1	0–0	0–4
Ried	1–0	0–0	2–1	2–1	3–0	0–0		3–0	1–0	2–1
Rapid Wien	7–0	2–0	3–0	4–2	2–1	0–0	2–2		0–2	3–0
Sturm Graz	7–0	0–0	3–2	1–0	0–0	4–2	2–1	3–0		1–1
Tirol Innsbruck	1–0	1–2	0–0	2–0	1–4	1–0	1–0	2–4	2–0	

Source: weltfussball.de (in German)
Legend: Blue = home team win; Yellow = draw; Red = away team win.

== Relegation play-offs ==
Team 1	Agg.	Team 2	1st leg	2nd leg
Admira/Wacker	7–3	Vorwärts Steyr	2–2	5–1

== Top goalscorers ==
Rank	Scorer	Club	Goals
1	(Czech Republic) René Wagner	Rapid Wien	21
2	(Austria) Thomas Janeschitz	Tirol Innsbruck	13
2	(Austria) Ivica Vastić	Sturm Graz	13
4	(Austria) Eduard Glieder	Austria Salzburg	12
5	(Netherlands) Marcel Oerlemans	SV Ried	11
5	(Austria) Herwig Drechsel	SV Ried	11
5	(Austria) Dietmar Kühbauer	Rapid Wien	11
5	(Austria) Manfred Rosenegger	Admira/Wacker	11
9	(Austria) Dieter Ramusch	Grazer AK	10
10	(Austria) Ronald Brunmayr	Austria Wien	9
10	(Austria) Peter Stöger	Rapid Wien	9

== Attendances ==
#	Club	Average
1	Salzburg	12,000
2	Rapid	9,072
3	LASK	7,222
4	Tirol	7,056
5	Sturm	6,556
6	Austria	5,981
7	Ried	4,917
8	Linz	4,546
9	GAC	4,528
10	Admira	2,192
