= Svend Hansen =

Svend Hansen may refer to:

- Svend Helge Hansen, a Danish rower
- Svend Hansen (footballer, born 1905), a Danish footballer
- Svend Hansen (footballer, born 1906), a Danish footballer
- Svend Hansen (footballer, born 1922), a Danish footballer
