= Sandro Silva =

Sandro Silva may refer to:

- Sandro da Silva (born 1974), Brazilian football midfielder
- Sandro Silva (footballer) (born 1984), Brazilian football midfielder
- Sandro Silva (DJ) (born 1992), Dutch DJ and producer
