= Markoski =

Markoski is a surname. Notable people with the surname include:

- Aleksandar Markoski (born 1975), Serbian former footballer
- Bojan Markoski (born 1983), Macedonian footballer
- Jovan Markoski (born 1980), Serbian footballer
- Kire Markoski (born 1995), Macedonian footballer
- Nikola Markoski (born 1990), Macedonian handball player

== See also ==
- Markovski
- Markowski
