= Markowski =

Markowski (feminine: Markowska, plural: Markowscy) is a Polish surname. It may refer to:

- Alexis Markowski (born 2003), American former basketball player
- Alfreda Markowska (1926–2021), Polish Porajmos survivor
- Andrzej Markowski (1924–1986), Polish composer
- Krzysztof Markowski (born 1979), Polish footballer
- Liesel Markowski (1928–2019), German musicologist
- Paul Markowski (meteorologist), American meteorologist and tornado expert
- Paul Markowski (politician) (1929–1978), East German politician
- Stephanie Markowski (born 2001), Canadian ice hockey player
- Tomasz Markowski (disambiguation)
- Vincent Markowski (1903–1954), birth name of American actor known professionally as Tom Tyler

== See also ==
- Markoski
- Markovski
