= Markovski =

Markovski or Markovsky (Cyrillic: Марковски or Марковский) is a Slavic masculine surname, its feminine counterpart is Markovska or Markovskaya. The surname may refer to:

- Aleksey Markovsky (born 1957), Russian swimmer
- Gjorgi Markovski (born 1986), Macedonian alpine skier
- Gorjan Markovski (born 1992), Macedonian basketball player
- Ivan Markovski (born 1935), Bulgarian ice hockey player
- John Markovski (born 1970), Australian soccer coach and former player of Macedonian descent
- Jovan Markovski (born 1988), Macedonian basketball small forward
- Leopoldo Roberto Markovsky (born 1983), Brazilian footballer
- Ljupčo Markovski (born 1967), Macedonian football central defender
- Marko Markovski (born 1986), Serbian footballer
- Mile Markovski (1939–1975), Bulgarian and Macedonian writer
- Venko Markovski (1915–1988), Bulgarian writer, poet, and politician of Macedonian descent
- Zare Markovski (born 1960), Macedonian basketball player and coach

== See also ==
- Markoski
- Markov
- Marković
- Markovits
- Markowski
