= Tomasz Markowski =

Tomasz Markowski may refer to:

- Tomasz Markowski (chess player) (born 1975), Polish chess Grandmaster
- Tomasz Markowski (politician) (born 1968), Polish politician

== See also ==
- Markowski
