= René Tengstedt =

Danish footballer and coach (born 1976)

Personal information
- Date of birth: 2 January 1976 (age 50)
- Height: 1.88 m (6 ft 2 in)
- Position: Midfielder

Youth career
- Aalborg Chang

Senior career*
| Years | Team | Apps | (Gls) |
| 1993–1996 | F.C. Copenhagen | 21 | (2) |
| 1996 | Næstved IF | 11 | (1) |
| 1998–1999 | Fortuna Düsseldorf | 4 | (0) |
| 1999–2001 | Lyngby FC | 17 | (0) |
| 2001–2002 | Fremad Amager | | |
| 2002–2003 | B.93 | | |
- Aalborg Chang
| Total | | 53 | (3) |

International career
| 1993–1995 | Denmark U19 | 7 | (0) |

Managerial career
- Aalborg Chang
- * Club domestic league appearances and goals

René Tengstedt (born 2 January 1976) is a Danish former professional footballer who played as a midfielder. He later worked as a coach.

== Club career ==
Tengstedt played club football for Aalborg Chang, F.C. Copenhagen, Næstved IF, Fortuna Düsseldorf, Lyngby FC, Fremad Amager and B.93.

By April 2005, at the age of 29, he had retired from professional football, and combined playing for amateur club Aalborg Chang (the club he began his career with) with training to be a teacher. By October 2006 he was working as a player-manager of the club, alongside Jari Pedersen.

== International career ==
He represented Denmark at under-19 youth level.

== Honours ==
Copenhagen

- Danish Cup: 1994–95
- Danish Super Cup: 1995
