= Piotr Sowisz =

Polish footballer

Personal information
- Full name: Piotr Sowisz
- Date of birth: 10 September 1971 (age 55)
- Place of birth: Wodzisław Śląski, Poland
- Height: 1.87 m (6 ft 1 1/2 in)
- Position: Midfielder

Senior career*
Years	Team	Apps	(Gls)
1989–2000	Odra Wodzisław Śląski		
2001	Kyoto Purple Sanga	21	(1)
2002	Odra Wodzisław Śląski	4	(0)
2002	Tłoki Gorzyce	10	(2)
2003	Świt Nowy Dwór Mazowiecki	5	(0)
2003–2006	Przyszłość Rogów		
2006	Start Mszana		
2007–2008	Gosław Jedłownik		

Managerial career
- 2011–2013: Polonia Marklowice
- 2013: Odra Wodzisław Śląski
- MKS Czerwionka
- 2022–2023: Czarni Gorzyce
- 2023–2024: Start Mszana
- * Club domestic league appearances and goals

Piotr Sowisz (born 10 September 1971) is a Polish professional football manager and former player who played as a midfielder.
