= Jari Pedersen =

Danish footballer (born 1976)

Personal information
- Date of birth: 2 September 1976 (age 50)
- Position: Striker

Senior career*
Years	Team	Apps	(Gls)
1995–2000	AaB	43	(4)
2000–2001	Lyngby FC	16	(1)
- Aalborg Chang
Total		59	(5)

Managerial career
- Aalborg Chang
- * Club domestic league appearances and goals

Jari Pedersen (born 2 September 1976) is a Danish former professional footballer who played as a striker. He later worked as a coach.

== Career ==
Pedersen played club football for AaB and Lyngby FC.

By October 2006 he was working as a player-manager of amateur club Aalborg Chang, alongside René Tengstedt.
