= Gert Cannaerts =

Belgian footballer

Personal information
- Date of birth: 5 July 1963 (age 63)
- Height: 1.87 m (6 ft 2 in)
- Position: Midfielder

Senior career*
Years	Team	Apps	(Gls)
1987–1999	Lommelse S.K.		
- * Club domestic league appearances and goals

Gert Cannaerts (born 5 July 1963) is a retired Belgian football midfielder.
