= Rastislav Ján Lazorík =

Slovak footballer

Ján Lazorík
Personal information
- Full name: Rastislav Ján Lazorík
- Date of birth: 16 April 1973 (age 53)
- Place of birth: Košice, Czechoslovakia
- Height: 1.84 m (6 ft 0 in)
- Position: Centre forward

Youth career
- 1992: MFK Košice

Senior career*
Years	Team	Apps	(Gls)
1993	MFK Košice		
1994–1995	Breiðablik	32	(16)
1995	Baník Horná Nitra	?	(?)
1996–1998	Leiftur	47	(13)
1997	→ Tatran Prešov (loan)	?	(?)
1999	KA Akureyri	8	(2)
1999–2000	Thesprotos	23	(7)
2001–2002	Marko	?	(?)
2002–2003	Atromitos	?	(?)
2003	Leonidio	?	(?)
2003–2004	AEL	?	(?)
2004–2005	Kavala	?	(?)
2005–2006	Levadiakos	?	(?)
2006–2008	Anagennisi Karditsa	?	(?)
2008	Víðir	8	(3)
- * Club domestic league appearances and goals

Rastislav Ján Lazorík (born 16 April 1973) is a Slovak retired footballer who played primarily as a forward. He spent most of his career in several Greek teams.
