= Boško Mihajlović =

Serbian footballer

Personal information
- Full name: Boško Mihajlović
- Date of birth: October 10, 1971 (age 55)
- Place of birth: Novi Sad, SFR Yugoslavia
- Height: 1.80 m (5 ft 11 in)
- Position: Forward

Senior career*
Years	Team	Apps	(Gls)
1992–1997	Proleter Zrenjanin	125	(26)
1997–1998	Panachaiki	17	(6)
1998–2000	Rad	28	(4)
2000–2002	Proleter Zrenjanin	82	(17)
2004–2006	Mladost Lukićevo	?	(?)
2006–2010	Naftagas Elemir	60	(7)
Total		312	(60)
- * Club domestic league appearances and goals

Boško Mihajlović (Serbian Cyrillic: Бошко Михајловић; born October 10, 1971) is a Serbian former footballer.

Mihajlović started his career in FK Proleter Zrenjanin in 1992. He played 6 seasons for Proleter (1992-1997) and then one and a half season for Panachaiki F.C. from Greece. After two seasons in Greece he moved to Serbia again to sign for FK Rad. He stayed in Rad for two seasons when he moved again to Proleter.

In 2002, he suffers injury and retires from Proleter. Two years later and he returns to football, this time as player-manager for semi-professional club FK Mladost Lukićevo. Finally, in 2006 he moved to FK Naftagas Elemir where he retires from football in 2010.
