= Zoran Kulić =

Serbian footballer

Personal information
- Full name: Zoran Kulić
- Date of birth: 19 August 1975 (age 51)
- Place of birth: Zemun, SFR Yugoslavia
- Height: 1.89 m (6 ft 2 1/2 in)
- Position: Midfielder

Senior career*
Years	Team	Apps	(Gls)
1994–1995	Jedinstvo Surčin		
1995–1999	Hajduk Kula	62	(1)
1998	→ Bečej (loan)	12	(1)
2000	Sileks	19	(3)
2001	Dynamo-2 Kyiv	10	(1)
2001	Dynamo-3 Kyiv	3	(0)
2001–2002	Mladost Lučani	31	(8)
2002–2005	Smederevo	32	(3)
2005–2006	Budućnost Banatski Dvor	18	(0)
- * Club domestic league appearances and goals

Zoran Kulić (Serbian Cyrillic: Зоран Кулић; born 19 August 1975) is a Serbian retired footballer.

== Statistics ==
Club	Season	League	
Club	Season	Apps	Goals
Hajduk Kula	1999–00	5	0
Mladost Lučani	2001–02	31	8
Smederevo	2002–03	17	3
Smederevo	2003–04	8	0
Smederevo	2004–05	7	0
Budućnost Banatski Dvor	2005–06	18	0
