= Grzegorz Wędzyński =

Polish footballer and coach

Grzegorz Wedzysnki גז'גורז ודז'ינסקי
Personal information
- Date of birth: 4 June 1970 (age 56)
- Place of birth: Przasnysz, Poland
- Height: 1.74 m (5 ft 9 in)
- Position: Midfielder

Team information
- Current team: Polonia New York Soccer Club (manager)

Youth career
- –1987: MZKS Przasnysz

Senior career*
Years	Team	Apps	(Gls)
1987–1999	Polonia Warsaw		
1993	→ Legia Warsaw (loan)	11	(0)
1994	→ Legia Warsaw (loan)	30	(1)
1995–1996	→ ŁKS Łódź (loan)	30	(6)
1999–2002	Maccabi Tel Aviv	101	(7)
2002–2003	Hapoel Rishon LeZion	30	(3)
2003–2004	Ironi Kiryat Shmona		
2004–2007	Górnik Łęczna	52	(6)
2007–2008	Polonia Warsaw	41	(2)
2008–2010	Narew Ostrołęka	16	(0)
2010–2011	Pogoń Siedlce	30	(5)
2013	Icon	6	(0)
2013–2015	Polonia New York Soccer Club		

International career
1998–1999	Poland	2	(0)

Managerial career
- 2010–2011: Pogoń Siedlce (player-manager)
- 2012: Elana Toruń
- 2013–: Polonia New York Soccer Club
- * Club domestic league appearances and goals

Grzegorz Wedzynski (Hebrew: גז'גורז ודז'ינסקי; born 4 June 1970) is a Polish football manager and former player who is currently in charge of Polonia New York Soccer Club.

== Career ==
Wedzynski started his senior career with MKP Pogoń Siedlce. In 1995. he signed for ŁKS Łódź in the Polish Ekstraklasa, where he made thirty league appearances and scored six goals. After that, he played for Polonia Warsaw, Maccabi Tel Aviv, Hapoel Rishon LeZion, Hapoel Ironi Kiryat Shmona, Górnik Łęczna, Narew Ostrołęka, Pogoń Siedlce, Icon, and Polonia New York Soccer Club.

== Honours ==
Legia Warsaw

- Ekstraklasa: 1993–94, 1994–95
- Polish Cup: 1993–94, 1994–95
- Polish Super Cup: 1995

Maccabi Tel Aviv

- Israel State Cup: 2000–01, 2001–02

Pogoń Siedlce

- III liga Łódź–Masovia: 2010–11
