= Dirk Weetendorf =

German former professional footballer (born 1972)

Personal information
- Full name: Dirk Weetendorf
- Date of birth: 1 October 1972 (age 54)
- Place of birth: Burg auf Fehmarn, West Germany
- Height: 1.87 m (6 ft 2 in)
- Position: Striker

Youth career
- SV Heringsdorf
- TSV Heiligenhafen
- SV Fehmarn
- Oldenburger SV

Senior career*
Years	Team	Apps	(Gls)
–1996	TSV Pansdorf		
1996–1998	Hamburger SV	23	(3)
1998–1999	Werder Bremen	7	(0)
1999–2003	Eintracht Braunschweig	60	(37)
Total		90	(40)

Managerial career
- 2003–2007: Eintracht Braunschweig (youth)
- 2009–2012: ATSV Stockelsdorf
- * Club domestic league appearances and goals as of 1 January 2013

Dirk Weetendorf (born 1 October 1972) is a German former professional footballer, who played as a striker, and manager.

== Career ==
Weetendorf was born in Burg auf Fehmarn. Between 1996 and 1999 he played three seasons in the Bundesliga for Hamburger SV and Werder Bremen, but did not become a regular starter at either club. In 1999, he moved to Regionalliga Nord side Eintracht Braunschweig, where he became a prolific scorer and contributed significantly to the club's promotion to the 2. Bundesliga in 2002. However, constant injury problems forced Weetendorf to retire early from football just one year later.

== Honours ==
- DFB-Pokal: 1998–99
