= Salif Keita (Senegalese footballer) =

Senegalese footballer

Salif Keïta
Personal information
- Date of birth: 19 October 1975 (age 51)
- Place of birth: Dakar, Senegal
- Height: 1.76 m (5 ft 9 in)
- Position: Striker

Senior career*
Years	Team	Apps	(Gls)
1991–1994	Germinal Ekeren	13	(2)
1994–1997	Cappellen	89	(43)
1997–1998	Genk	19	(2)
1998–1999	K.V. Kortrijk	28	(13)
1999–2002	Hannover 96	49	(8)
2002–2004	Union Berlin	58	(13)
2004–2005	Rot-Weiß Oberhausen	23	(8)
2005–2007	TuS Koblenz	50	(15)
2007–2008	Pierikos	16	(4)
2008	Olympiakos Nicosia	14	(6)
2009	APEP Pitsilia	6	(0)
2009–2010	AS Douanes	43	(9)
Total		408	(123)

International career
1993–2000	Senegal	12	(6)
- * Club domestic league appearances and goals

Salif Keïta (born 19 October 1975, in Dakar) is a Senegalese former professional footballer who played as a striker.

== Honours ==
Genk

- Belgian Cup: 1997–98
