= Bruno Alicarte =

French footballer (born 1972)

Personal information
- Date of birth: 18 January 1972 (age 54)
- Place of birth: Perpignan, France
- Height: 1.75 m (5 ft 9 in)
- Position: Defender

Youth career
- FC Canet 66

Senior career*
Years	Team	Apps	(Gls)
1989–1995	Montpellier		
1995–1996	Bastia	20	(0)
1996–1997	Alavés	9	(0)
1997–1999	Neuchâtel Xamax		
1999–2000	Montpellier	0	(0)
2001–2003	Naval 1º de Maio		
2003–2004	Laval	10	(0)
- * Club domestic league appearances and goals

Bruno Alicarte (born 18 January 1972) is a French former professional footballer who played as a defender.

Born in Perpignan, he played for Montpellier HSC, SC Bastia, Deportivo Alavés, Neuchâtel Xamax, Naval 1º de Maio and Stade Lavallois.

Bruno's younger brother is Hervé Alicarte.
