= Markus Osthoff =

German footballer

Personal information
- Date of birth: 19 November 1968 (age 57)
- Place of birth: Saarbrücken, West Germany
- Height: 1.72 m (5 ft 8 in)
- Position: Midfielder

Youth career
- SV Saar 05 Saarbrücken
- 1. FC Kaiserslautern

Senior career*
Years	Team	Apps	(Gls)
1990–1991	1. FC Saarbrücken	2	(0)
1991–1994	Eintracht Trier		
1994–2000	MSV Duisburg	160	(14)
2000–2002	Borussia Mönchengladbach	30	(4)
2002–2003	Eintracht Braunschweig	6	(0)
2002–2003	→ Eintracht Braunschweig II	1	(0)
- * Club domestic league appearances and goals

Markus Osthoff (born 19 November 1968) is a German former professional footballer played as a midfielder.

== Honours ==
MSV Duisburg

- DFB-Pokal finalist: 1997–98
