= Holger Gaißmayer =

German footballer (born 1970)

Personal information
- Date of birth: 2 July 1970 (age 56)
- Place of birth: Essen, West Germany
- Height: 1.80 m (5 ft 11 in)
- Position: Forward

Youth career
- –1991: TuSEM Essen

Senior career*
Years	Team	Apps	(Gls)
1991–1995	Rot-Weiß Oberhausen		
1995–1998	1. FC Köln	87	(16)
1998–1999	Rot-Weiß Oberhausen	14	(3)
1999	VfB Leipzig	7	(1)
1999	SC Bregenz	7	(0)
1999–2000	Kickers Offenbach	13	(3)
2000–2001	LR Ahlen	18	(1)
2001–2002	Adler Osterfeld		
2002–2005	Wuppertaler SV Borussia	34	(4)
2005–2008	FSV Vohwinkel		
- * Club domestic league appearances and goals

Holger Gaißmayer (born 2 July 1970) is a German former professional footballer who played as a forward. He played for 1. FC Köln, Rot-Weiß Oberhausen, Kickers Offenbach and LR Ahlen in Bundesliga and 2. Bundesliga.
