= Ali Akdeniz =

Turkish footballer

Personal information
- Date of birth: 17 April 1975 (age 51)
- Place of birth: Aydın, Turkey
- Height: 1.80 m (5 ft 11 in)
- Position: Midfielder

Senior career*
Years	Team	Apps	(Gls)
1993–1995	Aydınspor		
1995–1996	Eskişehirspor		
1996–2001	Samsunspor		
2001–2003	Fenerbahçe		
2003–2004	Denizlispor		
2004–2005	Samsunspor		
2005	→ MKE Ankaragücü (loan)		
2005–2006	Kayseri Erciyesspor		
- * Club domestic league appearances and goals

Ali Akdeniz (born 17 April 1975) is a Turkish former professional footballer who played as a midfielder.
