= Fredrik Andersson (footballer, born 1971) =

Swedish footballer

Personal information
- Date of birth: 18 February 1971 (age 55)
- Place of birth: Halmstad, Sweden
- Position: Defender

Youth career
- Halmstads BK

Senior career*
Years	Team	Apps	(Gls)
1988–2001	Halmstads BK	256	(14)
2002	Snöstorp Nyhem FF		
2003	IS Örnia		
2004	Simlångsdalens IF		

International career
1990	Sweden U21	2	(0)
1996	Sweden B	1	(0)
- * Club domestic league appearances and goals

Fredrik "Fidde" Andersson (born 18 January 1971) is a Swedish retired football defender who spent most of his career with Halmstads BK.

Andersson made around 500 appearances for Halmstads BK, helping them win the 1997 and 2000 Allsvenskan titles, as well as the 1994–95 Svenska Cupen.

He appeared twice for the Sweden U21 team, and once for the Sweden B team.

== Honours ==
=== Club ===
Halmstads BK

- Allsvenskan: 1997, 2000
- Svenska Cupen: 1994–95

=== Individual ===
- HP:s Dribbler: 1996
