= Nenad Veselji =

Maltese footballer

Personal information
- Date of birth: 3 February 1971 (age 55)
- Place of birth: SFR Yugoslavia
- Position: Striker

Senior career*
Years	Team	Apps	(Gls)
1988–1989	OFK Beograd	1	(0)
1994–1997	Floriana	40	(6)
1997–2001	Valletta	77	(36)
2000–2001	Birkirkara	2	(0)
2001–2004	Sliema Wanderers	47	(14)
2003–2004	→ Valletta (loan)	11	(4)
2004–2005	Kerċem Ajax		
2005–2006	St. Andrews	5	(0)
Total		183	(60)

International career^{‡}
1999–2000	Malta	8	(0)
- * Club domestic league appearances and goals as of 3 February 2010 ‡ National team caps and goals as of 3 February 2010

Nenad Veselji (born 3 February 1971) is a retired footballer who played as a striker. Born in the SFR Yugoslavia, he represented Malta internationally.

== Club career ==
Veselji started his career while still in Yugoslavia playing for OFK Beograd. In 1994, he came to Malta and started playing for Floriana FC where he played for three seasons. In 1997, he moved to Valletta FC. He spent his best years of his career playing for Valletta, where he stayed until January 2001, when he moved for a short spell with Birkirkara FC. In 2001, he moved to Sliema Wanderers where he played until January 2004, before rejoining Valletta FC and after half a season he moved to Gozitan side

Having represented the best Maltese clubs in the period, Veselji played an impressive 177 matches in the Maltese Premier League, having scored 60 goals in ten seasons he played.

== International career ==
Veselji has also represented the Malta national football team a total of eight times between the years 1999 and 2000.

== Honours ==
- Floriana
  - 2 times winner of Super 5 Cup: 1994–95 and 1995–96
- Valletta
  - 3 times Champion of Maltese Premier League: 1997–98, 1998–99 and 2000–01
  - 2 times winner of Maltese Cup: 1998–99 and 2000–01
  - 3 times winner of Maltese Super Cup: 1997–97, 1998–99 and 2000–01
  - 1-time winner of Löwenbräu Cup: 1997–98
  - 1-time winner of Super 5 Cup: 1999-00
  - 1-time winner of Centenary Cup: 2000
- Sliema Wanderers
  - 2 times Champion of Maltese Premier League: 2002–03 and 2003–04
  - 1-time winner of Löwenbräu Cup: 2002
  - 1-time winner of Super 5 Cup: 2001–02
