= Ernest Konon =

Polish footballer

Personal information
- Date of birth: 16 March 1974 (age 52)
- Place of birth: Jelenia Góra, Poland
- Height: 1.76 m (5 ft 9 in)
- Position: Forward

Senior career*
Years	Team	Apps	(Gls)
1993–1996	Karkonosze Jelenia Góra		
1996–1997	Lommel		
1997–1998	Genk	10	(2)
1998–2000	Cercle Brugge	40	(11)
2000–2001	Zuid-West-Vlaanderen	8	(1)
2001–2002	Enosis Neon Paralimni		
2001	→ Zagłębie Lubin (loan)	4	(0)
2002	ŁKS Łódź	7	(2)
2003	Śląsk Wrocław	9	(2)
2004–2008	Jagiellonia Białystok	87	(17)
2008	Tienen-Hageland	16	(6)
2008–2010	Korona Kielce	36	(8)
2010	Sokół Sokółka	7	(0)
2011	Lech Rypin	13	(3)
2012–2014	Dąb Dąbrowa Białostocka	63	(16)
- * Club domestic league appearances and goals

Ernest Konon (born 16 March 1974) is a Polish former professional footballer who played as a forward.

== Honours ==
Genk

- Belgian Cup: 1997–98
