= Jean-Christophe Rouvière =

French footballer (born 1974)

Personal information
- Date of birth: 4 August 1974 (age 52)
- Place of birth: Montpellier, France
- Height: 1.83 m (6 ft 0 in)
- Position: Midfielder

Senior career*
Years	Team	Apps	(Gls)
1993–1999	Montpellier	176	(3)
1999–2000	Bordeaux	18	(0)
2000–2001	Toulouse	29	(1)
2001–2005	Montpellier	113	(5)
2005–2007	Nîmes	53	(1)
- * Club domestic league appearances and goals

Jean-Christophe Rouvière (born 4 August 1974) is a French former professional footballer who played as a midfielder for Montpellier, Bordeaux, Toulouse and Nîmes. (Note: Jean-Christophe Rouvière – French league stats at LFP – also available in French (archived))
