= Lazaros Semos =

Greek footballer (born 1975)

Personal information
- Date of birth: 18 July 1975 (age 51)
- Place of birth: Ioannina, Greece
- Height: 1.92 m (6 ft 4 in)
- Position: Defender

Senior career*
Years	Team	Apps	(Gls)
–1996	PAS Giannina		
1996–2000	Iraklis		
2000–2001	PAS Giannina		
2001–2002	Akratitos		
2002–2003	Kassandra		
2003–2004	Doxa Katokopias		
2004	Veria		
2005	Acharnaikos		
2006	AE Giannena		
2007	Anatolis		
2007–2009	Doxa Kranoula		

International career
- Greece U23

Managerial career
- 2012–2013: AEL Limassol (assistant)
- * Club domestic league appearances and goals

Lazaros Semos (Greek: Λάζαρος Σέμος; born 18 July 1975) is a retired Greek football defender.

He was a squad member for Greece U23 at the 1997 Mediterranean Games.
