= Herwig Drechsel =

Austrian footballer

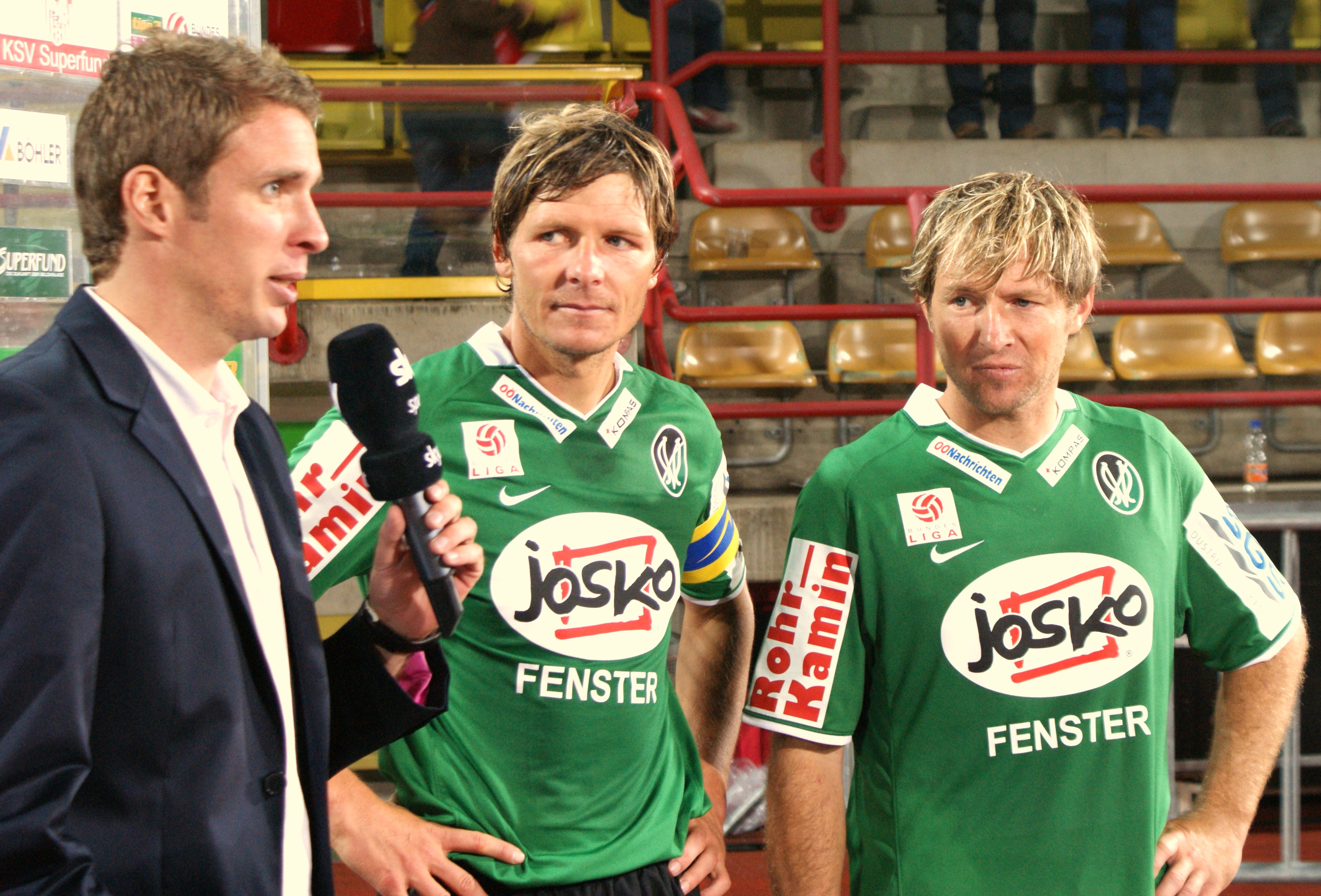
- Herwig Drechsel (right) with his teammate Oliver Glasner

Personal information
- Full name: Herwig Drechsel
- Date of birth: 4 September 1973 (age 53)
- Place of birth: Linz, Austria
- Height: 1.78 m (5 ft 10 in)
- Position: Midfielder

Youth career
- 1889–1993: Linz

Senior career*
Years	Team	Apps	(Gls)
1993–1994	Linz	16	(1)
1994–1998	Ried	99	(18)
1998–1999	Grazer AK	20	(3)
1999–2010	Ried	305	(87)
2010–2011	SV Grödig	32	(10)
2011–2014	SV Wallern		

Managerial career
- 2013–2015: SV Wallern (sporting director)
- 2015–2017: Ried (U16)
- 2017–2018: SV HAKA Traun
- 2018–2019: Bad Leonfelden
- 2019–2020: Ried (reserves)
- * Club domestic league appearances and goals

Herwig Drechsel (born 4 September 1973) is an Austrian retired professional association football player who played as a midfielder and current manager.

In his career he made over 350 Bundesliga appearances and was called up several times for the national team, but never played for them. In 2012, on the occasion of the 100th anniversary of SV Ried, he was named "Player of the Century".

== Career ==
Drechsel was active from 1995 to 2010 with a short break (1998/99 season at Grazer AK) for SV Ried and was always a top player as a midfielder and one of the top goal scorers as well as team captain from time to time. Drechsel, whose style of play was compared to that of a "classic ten", was also known for his free kicks, distance shots and his overview of the game. However, he did not make his debut in the Austrian Football Bundesliga for Ried, but for FC Linz. In May 2010, SV Ried announced that Herwig Drechsel's expiring contract would not be extended. In June 2010 he signed a new contract with the Austrian Football Second League club SV Grödig, but after only one year in Grödig he ended his successful professional career in May 2011 at the age of 37 and switched to the upper Austrian league promoters SV Wallern.

=== Later and coaching career ===
During his time at SV Wallern, from 2013 to 2015, Drechsel also functioned as the clubs sporting director. In the summer 2015, he was appointed head coach of SV Ried's U16 team. He left the position after two years.

After a six-month break, Drechsel was appointed head coach of SV HAKA Traun in the Upper Austrian District League East on 13 December 2017. He resigned on 29 August 2018. On 17 October 2018, he was then appointed head coach of SU Vortuna Bad Leonfelden. He left the position at the end of the season.

In the summer 2019, Drechsel returned to SV Ried where he became the new head coach of the clubs reserve team, also known as Jungen Wikinger Ried. He resigned at the end of the season for personal reasons.

== Personal life ==
Drechsel is married and has two sons (Stephan and Tobias). His son Stephan also plays football.
