= Sandro da Silva =

Brazilian footballer

Personal information
- Full name: Sandro André da Silva
- Date of birth: 5 March 1974 (age 52)
- Place of birth: Taubaté, Brazil
- Height: 1.69 m (5 ft 7 in)
- Position: Midfielder

Youth career
- Garça
- Nacional-SP
- União Rondonópolis
- Taubaté

Senior career*
Years	Team	Apps	(Gls)
1992–1995	Taubaté	56	(7)
1995–1996	Palmeiras		
1996–2001	Antwerp	93	(9)
2001–2002	Tecos	18	(1)
2002	Deportivo Italchacao		
2003	Kashima Antlers	1	(0)
2004	Avaí		
2004	Olimpia	3	(0)
2005	Ceará	7	(2)
2005	Guaratinguetá		
2006	Londrina		
2007	Nova Iguaçu		
2007	CFZ-RJ		
2008	Unión La Calera	14	(1)
2009–2010	Taubaté	(total)	(↑)
2010	São José	16	(4)
2010–2011	Atlético Sorocaba	38	(7)
2012	Arapongas	17	(1)

Managerial career
- 2012–2017: Taubaté (youth)
- 2018: Joseense U23
- 2019–2020: Taubaté (assistant)
- * Club domestic league appearances and goals

Sandro André da Silva (born 5 March 1974) is a Brazilian former professional footballer who played as a midfielder.

== Career ==
da Silva, then known as Sandrinho, started his career with Taubaté in 1992. In 1995, he signed with Palmeiras.

In 1996, da Silva moved to Europe and stood out as a player of Belgian club Royal Antwerp from 1996 to 2001. Besides Belgium, he played in his homeland, Mexico for Tecos, Venezuela for Deportivo Italchacao, Japan for Kashima Antlers, Paraguay for Olimpia and Chile for Unión La Calera.

Following his retirement, da Silva served as coach for the Taubaté youth ranks and the Joseense under-23 team.

== Personal life ==
His younger brother, Éber Henrique da Silva, also was a footballer who played for Taubaté.
