= Kolding Boldklub =

Danish football club

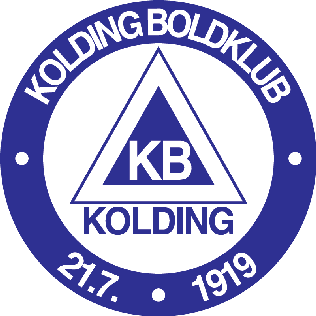
- Full name: Kolding Boldklub
- Nickname: —
- Founded: 1919
- Ground: Mosevejs Sportsplads, Kolding
- Capacity: 1,500
- Chairman: Carsten B. Grubach
- Manager: Anders Flaskager
- League: Denmark Series
- 2019–20: Denmark Series Group 3, 10th of 10
- Website: http://www.kolding-boldklub.dk
Home colours	Away colours

Kolding Boldklub is a Danish association football club from Kolding. KB, as the club commonly is known in Kolding (not to be confused with Kjøbenhavns Boldklub), plays in the Denmark Series, the fourth tier of the Danish football league system.

Founded in 1919, the club competed in the inaugural 1955 Danish Cup tournament, and also played in the cup in 1970 and again 10 times from 1982 to 2000.

From 2002 to 2011 the club was the one half of the Kolding FC-merger, the other half being Kolding IF. This merger merged with Vejle Boldklub in 2011 to form Vejle Boldklub Kolding. This merger however, was short-lived and was dissolved in 2013 and split into Vejle Boldklub, Kolding IF and Kolding Boldklub.
