= Svend Hansen (footballer, born 1905) =

Danish footballer

Personal information
- Date of birth: 5 December 1905
- Date of death: 25 January 1976 (aged 70)

International career
Years	Team	Apps	(Gls)
1931	Denmark	1	(0)

Svend Hansen (5 December 1905 – 25 January 1976) was a Danish footballer. He played in one match for the Denmark national football team in 1931.
