= Aalborg Chang =

Danish association football club

- Full name: Aalborg Chang
- Nickname: Klubben i centrum (English: The club in the center)
- Short name: Chang
- Founded: 1 September 1912; 113 years ago
- Ground: Chang Stadium, Aalborg
- Chairman: Morten Borregaard
- Head coach: Steffen Agerbo
- League: Jutland Series
- 2022: Jutland Series Group 1, 6th of 8
- Website: http://www.aalborgchang.dk/
Home colours	Away colours

Aalborg Chang is a Danish association football club based in the city of Aalborg, that competes in the Jutland Series, one of the sixth tiers of the Danish football league system, and the top tier of the regional DBU Jutland football association, to which it belongs. It was known as FC Nordjylland from 2001 to 2004. The club, founded in 1912, reached the 1955 Danish Cup final, and has played a number of seasons in the Danish divisions, most recently the 2003–04 Danish 1st Division season.

== History ==
The club was founded in 1912 by three 14-year-olds, and had initially teams in football and cricket, until the cricket club split off to become Aalborg Cricketklub in 2001. A tennis department was also added. The Chang football team established itself in the Danish divisions during World War II. The club grabbed the national headlines in 1955, as Chang reached the final of the inaugural Danish Cup tournament, while playing in the third-tier of Danish football. They lost the game 0–4 to that year's Danish champions AGF. In the following decades, the club was a constant part of either the Danish divisions or the Denmark Series, the single exception being the 1980 season in the Jutland Series.

In 2001, former professional footballer Ole Bach Jensen invested in Chang, and a professional team was established under the name FC Nordjylland. In 2004, Ole Bach Jensen withdrew his money, and the club went bankrupt. Aalborg Chang underwent forced relegation from the second-tier Danish 1st Division to the lowest-league Danish Series 6. When former player Per Krøldrup was transferred between professional European clubs in 2005 and 2006, a part of the transfer fee was taken as UEFA-mandated monetary compensation to his youth clubs, giving Aalborg Chang an economic kick-start following their bankruptcy.

== Honours ==
- Danish Cup:
  - Runners-up (1): 1954–55

== Seasons ==
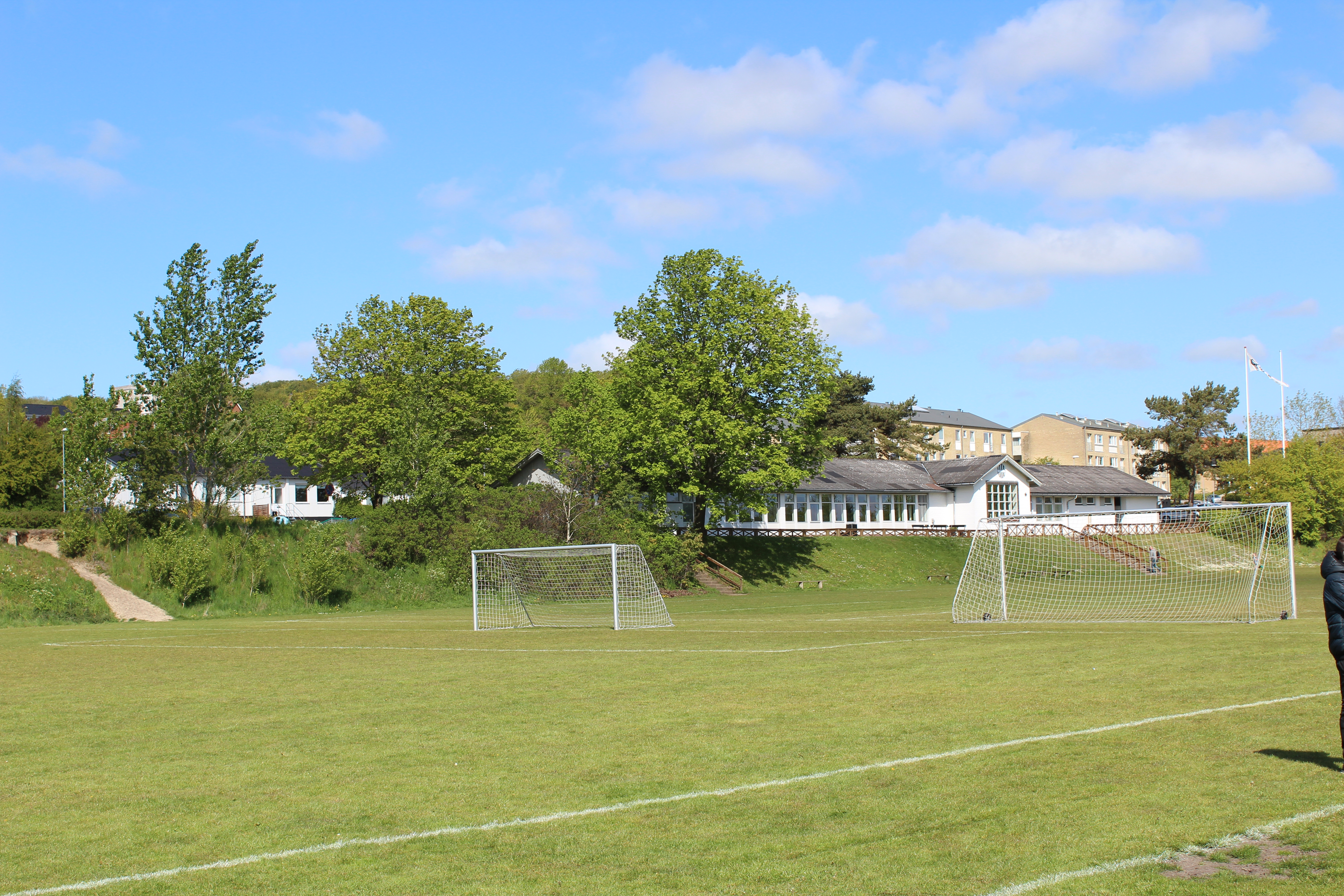
Home of Aalborg Chang seen from the football pitches, 2019.

Aalborg Chang has played the following seasons in the Danish divisions:

Year(s)	Division	Tier
1931–1933	2nd Division West	2nd
1942–1945	War Tournaments	1st
1945–1953	2nd Division	2nd
1953–1965	3rd Division	3rd
1966–1968	3rd Division West	3rd
1970–1971	3rd Division West	3rd
1986	3rd Division West	3rd
1992	2nd Division West	4th
1994	2nd Division West	4th
1996–1997	2nd Division West	3rd
1997–1998	1st Division	2nd
1998–2003	2nd Division	3rd
2003–2004	1st Division	2nd

== Notable former coaches ==
- Lynge Jakobsen (−1994)
- Søren Kusk (1994–1997)
- Per Westergaard (1998–2000)
- René Tengstedt & Jari Pedersen (2006–2007)
- René Tengstedt (2007–2008)
