= Hervé Alicarte =

French footballer (born 1974)

Personal information
- Date of birth: 7 October 1974 (age 52)
- Place of birth: Perpignan, France
- Height: 1.83 m (6 ft 0 in)
- Position: Defender

Senior career*
Years	Team	Apps	(Gls)
1994–1998	Montpellier	60	(7)
1998–2004	Bordeaux	72	(8)
2000–2001	→ Toulouse (loan)	8	(0)
2002–2003	→ Ajaccio (loan)	22	(2)
2004–2005	Servette	4	(0)
2005–2007	Nîmes	37	(9)
Total		203	(26)
- * Club domestic league appearances and goals

Hervé Alicarte (born 7 October 1974) is a French former professional footballer who played as a defender.

His previous clubs include Montpellier HSC, Bordeaux, Toulouse FC, AC Ajaccio and Servette FC. In his time at Bordeaux he won Ligue 1 in the 1998–99 season and was on the bench when they won the 2002 Coupe de la Ligue Final.

Hervé's brother is Bruno Alicarte.
