= Aleksandar Markoski =

Serbian footballer

Personal information
- Full name: Aleksandar Markoski
- Date of birth: 17 September 1975 (age 51)
- Place of birth: Zrenjanin, SFR Yugoslavia
- Height: 1.79 m (5 ft 10 1/2 in)
- Position: Midfielder

Senior career*
Years	Team	Apps	(Gls)
1994–1996	Radnički Zrenjanin		
1996–2002	Hajduk Kula	130	(10)
2002–2004	Proleter Zrenjanin		
2004–2006	Bežanija		
2006–2009	Banat Zrenjanin	60	(3)
- * Club domestic league appearances and goals as of 8 August 2009

Aleksandar Markoski (Serbian Cyrillic: Александар Маркоски; born 17 September 1975) is a Serbian former football player.

== Career statistics ==
Club	Season	League	
Club	Season	Apps	Goals
Hajduk Kula	1996–97	16	2
Hajduk Kula	1997–98	27	3
Hajduk Kula	1998–99	19	2
Hajduk Kula	1999–2000	35	2
Hajduk Kula	2000–01	16	1
Hajduk Kula	2001–02	17	0
Total		130	10
