= 2004–05 UEFA Cup qualifying rounds =

The 2004–05 UEFA Cup qualifying rounds was the qualification competition that determined the teams participating in the main competition of the 2004–05 UEFA Cup. It began on 13 July 2004 with the first qualifying round and ended on 26 August 2004 with the second qualifying round. The two qualifying rounds narrowed the clubs down to 80 teams in preparation for the first round.

Times are CEST (UTC+2), as listed by UEFA.

== Teams ==
Regions used to divide teams in the qualifying rounds of the UEFA Cup: Northern Central–East Southern–Mediterranean

In total, 89 teams entered qualifying stage, which consisted of the following rounds:

- First qualifying round (50 teams): 50 teams which enter in this round.
- Second qualifying round (64 teams): 39 teams which enter in this round, and 25 winners of the first qualifying round.

The 32 winners of the second qualifying round advanced to the first round, joining 42 other teams.

In the qualifying rounds, UEFA divided the participating teams into three geographical regions: Northern, Central–East, and Southern–Mediterranean. Teams were then seeded within their respective regions, rather than being seeded among all participating teams of the round. This meant that a club potentially seeded in an open draw format could be unseeded in the regional system, or vice versa. The regional allocation of countries was generally as follows:

- Northern: Belgium, Denmark, England, Estonia, Faroe Islands, Finland, Iceland, Latvia, Lithuania, Luxembourg, Netherlands, Northern Ireland, Norway, Republic of Ireland, Scotland, Sweden, Wales
- Central–East: Armenia, Austria, Azerbaijan, Belarus, Czech Republic, France, Georgia, Germany, Hungary, Liechtenstein, Moldova, Poland, Russia, Slovakia, Switzerland, Ukraine
- Southern–Mediterranean: Albania, Andorra, Bosnia and Herzegovina, Bulgaria, Croatia, Cyprus, Greece, Israel, Italy, Macedonia, Malta, Portugal, Romania, San Marino, Serbia and Montenegro, Slovenia, Spain, Turkey

However, UEFA could make exceptions to these allocations to ensure an even number of teams in each region.

Below were the participating teams of the qualifying rounds (with their 2004 UEFA club coefficients), grouped by their starting rounds.

Key to colours
Winners of second qualifying round advance to first round

Second qualifying round
Team	Region	Coeff.
(Czech Republic) Slavia Prague	C–E	49.914
(Croatia) Dinamo Zagreb	S–M	25.733
(Turkey) Gençlerbirliği	S–M	23.656
(Denmark) Brøndby	NOR	21.758
(Bulgaria) Levski Sofia	S–M	21.600
(Switzerland) Servette	C–E	20.382
(Poland) Legia Warsaw	C–E	20.176
(Serbia and Montenegro) Partizan	S–M	18.655
(Romania) Steaua București	S–M	17.881
(Poland) Amica Wronki	C–E	16.176
(Bulgaria) CSKA Sofia	S–M	15.600
(Ukraine) Dnipro Dnipropetrovsk	C–E	14.300
(Czech Republic) Sigma Olomouc	C–E	13.914
(Austria) Rapid Wien	C–E	12.970
(Bulgaria) Litex Lovech	S–M	12.600
(Norway) Stabæk	NOR	11.226
(Scotland) Dunfermline Athletic	NOR	10.600
(Russia) Zenit Saint Petersburg	C–E	9.572
(Belgium) Beveren	NOR	9.528
(Ukraine) Metalurh Donetsk	C–E	9.300
(Norway) Odd Grenland	NOR	9.226
Austria Wien	C–E	8.970
(Norway) Bodø/Glimt	NOR	8.226
(Poland) Lech Poznań	C–E	8.176
(Switzerland) Wil	C–E	7.382
(Israel) Bnei Sakhnin	S–M	7.012
(Israel) Maccabi Petah Tikva	S–M	7.012
(Austria) Superfund	C–E	6.970
(Croatia) Rijeka	S–M	6.733
(Serbia and Montenegro) Železnik	S–M	6.655
(Serbia and Montenegro) Budućnost Banatski Dvor	S–M	6.655
(Russia) Terek Grozny	C–E	6.572
(Russia) Rubin Kazan	C–E	6.572
(Denmark) AaB	NOR	5.758
(Sweden) IF Elfsborg	NOR	5.516
(Sweden) Hammarby IF	NOR	5.516
(Slovakia) Artmedia Bratislava	C–E	5.235
(Hungary) Újpest	C–E	5.046
(Cyprus) AEK Larnaca	S–M	2.970

First qualifying round
Team	Region	Coeff.
(Ukraine) Illichivets Mariupol	C–E	7.300
(Slovenia) Maribor	S–M	7.025
(Sweden) Östers IF	NOR	5.516
(Hungary) Honvéd	C–E	5.046
(Romania) Oțelul Galați	S–M	4.881
(Slovakia) Dukla Banská Bystrica	C–E	4.235
(Bosnia and Herzegovina) Željezničar	S–M	3.815
(Republic of Ireland) Bohemians	NOR	3.045
(Slovenia) Primorje	S–M	3.025
(Cyprus) Omonia	S–M	2.970
(Finland) Haka	NOR	2.938
(Moldova) Nistru Otaci	C–E	2.255
(Moldova) Tiraspol	C–E	2.255
(Malta) Birkirkara	S–M	2.100
(Latvia) Ventspils	NOR	1.980
(Latvia) Liepājas Metalurgs	NOR	1.980
(Finland) Allianssi	NOR	1.938
(Bosnia and Herzegovina) Modriča Maxima	S–M	1.815
(Georgia (country)) Dinamo Tbilisi	C–E	1.650
(Georgia (country)) Tbilisi	C–E	1.650
(North Macedonia) Sloga Jugomagnat	S–M	1.595
(North Macedonia) Sileks	S–M	1.595
(Lithuania) Žalgiris	NOR	1.375
(Lithuania) Ekranas	NOR	1.375
(Belarus) Shakhtyor Soligorsk	C–E	1.182
(Belarus) BATE Borisov	C–E	1.182
(Iceland) ÍA	NOR	1.100
(Iceland) FH	NOR	1.100
(Malta) Marsaxlokk	S–M	1.100
(Republic of Ireland) Longford Town	NOR	1.045
(Armenia) Mika	C–E	0.935
(Armenia) Shirak	C–E	0.935
(Armenia) Banants	C–E	0.935
(Wales) Total Network Solutions	NOR	0.770
(Wales) Haverfordwest County	NOR	0.770
(Liechtenstein) Vaduz	NOR	0.660
(Albania) Partizani	S–M	0.605
(Albania) Dinamo Tirana	S–M	0.605
(Estonia) Levadia Tallinn	NOR	0.550
(Estonia) TVMK	NOR	0.550
(Northern Ireland) Glentoran	NOR	0.550
(Northern Ireland) Portadown	NOR	0.550
(Luxembourg) F91 Dudelange	NOR	0.495
(Luxembourg) Etzella Ettelbruck	NOR	0.495
(Azerbaijan) Shamkir	C–E	0.385
(Azerbaijan) Qarabağ	C–E	0.385
(Faroe Islands) B36	NOR	0.275
(Faroe Islands) B68	NOR	0.275
(Andorra) FC Santa Coloma	S–M	0.000
(San Marino) Pennarossa	S–M	0.000

Notes

1. ^{†} Vaduz of Liechtenstein (usually in Central–East) were moved to the Northern region for both the first and second qualifying rounds.

== Format ==
Each tie is played over two legs, with each team playing one leg at home. The team that scores more goals on aggregate over the two legs advance to the next round. If the aggregate score is level, the away goals rule is applied, i.e. the team that scores more goals away from home over the two legs advances. If away goals are also equal, then extra time is played. The away goals rule is again applied after extra time, i.e. if there are goals scored during extra time and the aggregate score is still level, the visiting team advances by virtue of more away goals scored. If no goals are scored during extra time, the tie is decided by penalty shoot-out.

In the draws for each round, teams are seeded based on their UEFA club coefficients at the beginning of the season, with the teams divided into seeded and unseeded pots containing the same number of teams. A seeded team is drawn against an unseeded team to determine the ties. Prior to the draws, UEFA forms "groups" in accordance with the principles set by the Club Competitions Committee, but they are purely for convenience of the draw and do not resemble any real groupings in the sense of the competition. Teams from the same association or from associations with political conflicts as decided by UEFA may not be drawn into the same tie. After the draws, the order of legs of a tie may be reversed by UEFA due to scheduling or venue conflicts.

== Round and draw dates ==
The schedule was as follows (all draws are held at the UEFA headquarters in Nyon, Switzerland).

Round	Draw date	First leg	Second leg
First qualifying round	25 June 2004, 14:00	15 July 2004	29 July 2004
Second qualifying round	30 July 2004, 14:00	12 August 2004	26 August 2004

== First qualifying round ==
The draw for the first qualifying round was held on 25 June 2004, 14:00 CEST.

=== Seeding ===
A total of 50 teams played in the first qualifying round. Prior to the draw, UEFA divided the teams into three regions, with each region containing seeded and unseeded teams in accordance with the principles set by the Club Competitions Committee. Seeding of teams within each region was based on their 2004 UEFA club coefficients.

Southern–Mediterranean region		Central–East region		Northern region	
Seeded	Unseeded	Seeded	Unseeded	Seeded	Unseeded
(Slovenia) Maribor; (Romania) Oțelul Galați; (Bosnia and Herzegovina) Željezničar; (Slovenia) Primorje; (Cyprus) Omonia; (Malta) Birkirkara; (Bosnia and Herzegovina) Modriča Maxima	(North Macedonia) Sileks; (North Macedonia) Sloga Jugomagnat; (Malta) Marsaxlokk; (Albania) Partizani; (Albania) Dinamo Tirana; (Andorra) FC Santa Coloma; (San Marino) Pennarossa	(Ukraine) Illichivets Mariupol; (Hungary) Honvéd; (Slovakia) Dukla Banská Bystrica; (Moldova) Nistru Otaci; (Moldova) Tiraspol; (Georgia (country)) Dinamo Tbilisi; (Georgia (country)) Tbilisi	(Belarus) BATE Borisov; (Belarus) Shakhtyor Soligorsk; (Armenia) Banants; (Armenia) Mika; (Armenia) Shirak; (Azerbaijan) Qarabağ; (Azerbaijan) Shamkir	(Sweden) Östers IF; (Republic of Ireland) Bohemians; (Finland) Haka; (Latvia) Ventspils; (Latvia) Liepājas Metalurgs; (Finland) Allianssi; (Lithuania) Ekranas; (Lithuania) Žalgiris; (Iceland) FH; (Iceland) ÍA; (Republic of Ireland) Longford Town	(Wales) Haverfordwest County; (Wales) Total Network Solutions; (Liechtenstein) Vaduz; (Estonia) Levadia Tallinn; (Estonia) TVMK; (Northern Ireland) Glentoran; (Northern Ireland) Portadown; (Luxembourg) F91 Dudelange; (Luxembourg) Etzella Ettelbruck; (Faroe Islands) B36; (Faroe Islands) B68

=== Summary ===
The first legs were played on 13 and 15 July, and the second legs on 27 and 29 July 2004.

Team 1	Agg.	Team 2	1st leg	2nd leg
Southern–Mediterranean region
Sileks (North Macedonia)	1–2	(Slovenia) Maribor	0–1	1–1
Marsaxlokk (Malta)	0–3 (Note: Order of legs reversed after original draw.)	(Slovenia) Primorje	0–1	0–2
Pennarossa (San Marino)	1–9	(Bosnia and Herzegovina) Željezničar	1–5	0–4
Oțelul Galați (Romania)	8–1	(Albania) Dinamo Tirana	4–0	4–1
FC Santa Coloma (Andorra)	0–4	(Bosnia and Herzegovina) Modriča Maxima	0–1	0–3
Omonia (Cyprus)	8–1	(North Macedonia) Sloga Jugomagnat	4–0	4–1
Partizani (Albania)	5–4	(Malta) Birkirkara	4–2	1–2
Central–East region
Illichivets Mariupol (Ukraine)	4–0	(Armenia) Banants	2–0	2–0
Tbilisi (Georgia (country))	5–1	(Azerbaijan) Shamkir	1–0	4–1
BATE Borisov (Belarus)	2–4	(Georgia (country)) Dinamo Tbilisi	2–3	0–1
Shirak (Armenia)	1–4	(Moldova) Tiraspol	1–2	0–2
Nistru Otaci (Moldova)	3–2	(Belarus) Shakhtyor Soligorsk	1–1	2–1
Mika (Armenia)	1–2	(Hungary) Honvéd	0–1	1–1
Dukla Banská Bystrica (Slovakia)	4–0	(Azerbaijan) Qarabağ	3–0	1–0
Northern region
Levadia Tallinn (Estonia)	3–1	(Republic of Ireland) Bohemians	0–0	3–1
Haverfordwest County (Wales)	1–4	(Iceland) FH	0–1	1–3
Östers IF (Sweden)	4–1	(Wales) Total Network Solutions	2–0	2–1
Portadown (Northern Ireland)	2–4	(Lithuania) Žalgiris	2–2	0–2
B68 (Faroe Islands)	0–11	(Latvia) Ventspils	0–3	0–8
Haka (Finland)	5–2	(Luxembourg) Etzella Ettelbruck	2–1	3–1
Ekranas (Lithuania)	3–1	(Luxembourg) F91 Dudelange	1–0	2–1
Vaduz (Liechtenstein)	4–2	(Republic of Ireland) Longford Town	1–0	3–2
B36 (Faroe Islands)	2–11	(Latvia) Liepājas Metalurgs	1–3	1–8
Glentoran (Northern Ireland)	4–3	(Finland) Allianssi	2–2	2–1
ÍA (Iceland)	6–3	(Estonia) TVMK	4–2	2–1

=== Southern–Mediterranean region ===
15 July 2004
20:00

Sileks (North Macedonia)	0–1	(Slovenia) Maribor
	Report	Kvas 45'

Gradski stadion, Skopje
Attendance: 1,500
Referee: Robert Johnsdorf (Luxembourg)
29 July 2004
19:00

Maribor (Slovenia)	1–1	(North Macedonia) Sileks
Jelić 7'	Report	Ristić 78'

Ljudski vrt, Maribor
Attendance: 3,500
Referee: Tsvetan Georgiev (Bulgaria)

Maribor won 2–1 on aggregate.

15 July 2004
20:00

Marsaxlokk (Malta)	0–1	(Slovenia) Primorje
	Report	Jolič 41'

National Stadium, Ta' Qali
Attendance: 240
Referee: Albano Janku (Albania)
29 July 2004
19:00

Primorje (Slovenia)	2–0	(Malta) Marsaxlokk
Jolič 12'; Miloš 15'	Report

Sports Park, Nova Gorica
Attendance: 330
Referee: Ararat Chagharyan (Armenia)

Primorje won 3–0 on aggregate.

15 July 2004
20:45

Pennarossa (San Marino)	1–5	(Bosnia and Herzegovina) Željezničar
Zaboul 86'	Report	Gredić 1'; Raščić 6', 11'; Karić 31'; Vršajević 80'

Olimpico, Serravalle
Attendance: 852
Referee: Sergey Tsaregradskiyi (Kazakhstan)
29 July 2004
18:00

Željezničar (Bosnia and Herzegovina)	4–0	(San Marino) Pennarossa
Kajtaz 21'; Kurt 32'; Raščić 40', 58'	Report

Stadion Grbavica, Sarajevo
Attendance: 4,253
Referee: Joseph Attard (Malta)

Željezničar won 9–1 on aggregate.

15 July 2004
19:00

Oțelul Galați (Romania)	4–0	(Albania) Dinamo Tirana
Negru 10'; Nanu 17'; Iacob 26'; Apostol 44'	Report

Stadionul Farul, Constanța
Attendance: 1,429
Referee: Siniša Zrnić (Bosnia and Herzegovina)
29 July 2004
19:00

Dinamo Tirana (Albania)	1–4	(Romania) Oțelul Galați
Qose 23'	Report	Danciu 21' (pen.), 80'; Rohat 37'; Aldea 69'

Qemal Stafa Stadium, Tirana
Attendance: 350
Referee: José Luis Mengual Prades (Andorra)

Oțelul Galați won 8–1 on aggregate.

15 July 2004
19:15

FC Santa Coloma (Andorra)	0–1	(Bosnia and Herzegovina) Modriča Maxima
	Report	Vasić 55'

Camp d'Esports d'Aixovall, Andorra La Vella
Attendance: 1,000
Referee: Sašo Lazarevski (Macedonia)
29 July 2004
17:30

Modriča Maxima (Bosnia and Herzegovina)	3–0	(Andorra) FC Santa Coloma
Ljubičić 35'; Novaković 66'; Pavić 88'	Report

Novi Gradski Stadion, Ugljevik
Attendance: 550
Referee: Karen Nalbandyan (Armenia)

Modriča Maxima won 4–0 on aggregate.

15 July 2004
19:00

Omonia (Cyprus)	4–0	(North Macedonia) Sloga Jugomagnat
Charalambous 40'; Kožlej 47'; Makris 83', 90'	Report

GSP Stadium, Nicosia
Attendance: 12,039
Referee: Adrian D. Casha (Malta)
29 July 2004
20:00

Sloga Jugomagnat (North Macedonia)	1–4	(Cyprus) Omonia
Nuhiji 84'	Report	Georgiou 10'; Mihajlović 50'; Kaiafas 69'; Kekić 90'

Gradski stadion, Skopje
Attendance: 1,500
Referee: Dietmar Drabek (Austria)

Omonia won 8–1 on aggregate.

15 July 2004
18:00

Partizani (Albania)	4–2	(Malta) Birkirkara
Bulku 23'; Bylykbashi 27' (pen.); Alcani 51'; Bejzade 69'	Report	Brachini 34' (o.g.); Mallia 82'

Qemal Stafa Stadium, Tirana
Attendance: 800
Referee: Paulo Paraty (Portugal)
29 July 2004
20:00

Birkirkara (Malta)	2–1	(Albania) Partizani
Zahra 56'; Dronca 84'	Report	Bylykbashi 45'

National Stadium, Ta' Qali
Attendance: 870
Referee: Marian Salomir (Romania)

Partizani won 5–4 on aggregate.

=== Central–East region ===
15 July 2004
18:30

Illichivets Mariupol (Ukraine)	2–0	(Armenia) Banants
Zakarlyuka 53', 84'	Report

Illichivets Stadium, Mariupol
Attendance: 12,680
Referee: Marek Mikolajewski (Poland)
29 July 2004
17:00

Banants (Armenia)	0–2	(Ukraine) Illichivets Mariupol
	Report	Yesin 30'; Platonov 77'

Vazgen Sargsyan Republican Stadium, Yerevan
Attendance: 4,500
Referee: Joeri van de Velde (Belgium)

Illichivets Mariupol won 4–0 on aggregate.

15 July 2004
17:00

Tbilisi (Georgia (country))	1–0	(Azerbaijan) Shamkir
Chelidze 34'	Report

Mikheil Meskhi Stadium, Tbilisi
Attendance: 5,000
Referee: Aleh Chykun (Belarus)
29 July 2004
16:00

Shamkir (Azerbaijan)	1–4	(Georgia (country)) Tbilisi
Aliyev 90'	Report	Chelidze 26'; Mikuchadze 40', 78'; Kvaratskhelia 83'

Shamkir City Stadium, Shamkir
Attendance: 5,000
Referee: Luc Wilmes (Luxembourg)

Tbilisi won 5–1 on aggregate.

15 July 2004
17:30

BATE Borisov (Belarus)	2–3	(Georgia (country)) Dinamo Tbilisi
Zhevnov 15'; Strakhanovich 19' (pen.)	Report	Kakaladze 45'; Goncharov 56'; Romero 90'

City Stadium, Borisov
Attendance: 2,850
Referee: Sten Kaldma (Estonia)
29 July 2004
18:00

Dinamo Tbilisi (Georgia (country))	1–0	(Belarus) BATE Borisov
Kvirkvelia 86'	Report

Boris Paichadze Stadium, Tbilisi
Attendance: 2,951
Referee: Mark Whitby (Wales)

Dinamo Tbilisi won 4–2 on aggregate.

15 July 2004
17:00

Shirak (Armenia)	1–2	(Moldova) Tiraspol
Davtyan 70' (pen.)	Report	Josan 6'; Barburoş 40' (pen.)

Vazgen Sargsyan Republican Stadium, Yerevan
Attendance: 2,300
Referee: Attila Dubraviczky (Hungary)
29 July 2004
19:00

Tiraspol (Moldova)	2–0	(Armenia) Shirak
Corneencov 9'; Nesteruk 56'	Report

Sheriff Stadium, Tiraspol
Attendance: 3,200
Referee: Loizos Loizou (Cyprus)

Tiraspol won 4–1 on aggregate.

15 July 2004
18:00

Nistru Otaci (Moldova)	1–1	(Belarus) Shakhtyor Soligorsk
Hroshev 73'	Report	Bespansky 47'

Stadionul Republican, Chișinău
Attendance: 1,050
Referee: Darius Miezelis (Lithuania)
29 July 2004
16:30

Shakhtyor Soligorsk (Belarus)	1–2	(Moldova) Nistru Otaci
Sļesarčuks 6'	Report	Belavusaw 25' (o.g.); Pogreban 88'

Traktor Stadium, Minsk
Attendance: 2,000
Referee: Jari Maisonlahti (Finland)

Nistru Otaci won 3–2 on aggregate.

13 July 2004
18:00

Mika (Armenia)	0–1	(Hungary) Honvéd
	Report	Csobánki 90'

Vazgen Sargsyan Republican Stadium, Yerevan
Attendance: 4,000
Referee: Michael Thomas Ross (Northern Ireland)
29 July 2004
20:00

Honvéd (Hungary)	1–1	(Armenia) Mika
Bábik 59'	Report	Shahgeldyan 42'

Üllői úti stadion, Budapest
Attendance: 1,600
Referee: Khagani Mammadov (Azerbaijan)

Honvéd won 2–1 on aggregate.

15 July 2004
17:00

Dukla Banská Bystrica (Slovakia)	3–0	(Azerbaijan) Qarabağ
Semeník 50'; Svintek 64'; Pečovský 77'	Report

SNP Stadium, Banská Bystrica
Attendance: 6,050
Referee: Attila Abraham (Hungary)
29 July 2004
17:00

Qarabağ (Azerbaijan)	0–1	(Slovakia) Dukla Banská Bystrica
	Report	Jabbarov 61' (o.g.)

Shafa stadium, Baku
Attendance: 4,000
Referee: Ioakim Efthimiadis (Greece)

Dukla Banská Bystrica won 4–0 on aggregate.

=== Northern region ===
15 July 2004
18:00

Levadia Tallinn (Estonia)	0–0	(Republic of Ireland) Bohemians
	Report

Kadriorg Stadium, Tallinn
Attendance: 2,191
Referee: Marijo Strahonja (Croatia)
27 July 2004
20:45

Bohemians (Republic of Ireland)	1–3	(Estonia) Levadia Tallinn
Crowe 55'	Report	Čepauskas 10'; Tšelnokov 69'; Dovydenas 78'

Dalymount Park, Dublin
Attendance: 3,852
Referee: Robert Krajnc (Slovenia)

Levadia Tallinn won 3–1 on aggregate.

15 July 2004
20:30

Haverfordwest County (Wales)	0–1	(Iceland) FH
	Report	Borgvardt 74'

Ninian Park, Cardiff
Attendance: 612
Referee: Nebojša Rabrenović (Serbia and Montenegro)
29 July 2004
21:15

FH (Iceland)	3–1	(Wales) Haverfordwest County
Thomas 20' (o.g.); Hallfreðsson 63'; Bett 65'	Report	Hicks 19'

Kaplakrikavöllur, Hafnarfjörður
Attendance: 610
Referee: Kjell Alseth (Norway)

FH won 4–1 on aggregate.

15 July 2004
19:00

Östers IF (Sweden)	2–0	(Wales) Total Network Solutions
Cederquist 77', 83'	Report

Värendsvallen, Växjö
Attendance: 1,153
Referee: Oleh Oriekhov (Ukraine)
29 July 2004
20:30

Total Network Solutions (Wales)	1–2	(Sweden) Östers IF
Wilde 79'	Report	Cederqvist 11'; Söderberg 88'

Racecourse Ground, Wrexham
Attendance: 654
Referee: Kostadin Kostadinov (Bulgaria)

Östers IF won 4–1 on aggregate.

15 July 2004
20:00

Portadown (Northern Ireland)	2–2	(Lithuania) Žalgiris
McCann 12', 16'	Report	Maksimovicius 66'; Stesko 80'

Shamrock Park, Portadown
Attendance: 528
Referee: Anton Helesteanu (Romania)
29 July 2004
18:00

Žalgiris (Lithuania)	2–0	(Northern Ireland) Portadown
Mikuckis 7'; Kauspadas 20'	Report

Žalgiris Stadium, Vilnius
Attendance: 1,500
Referee: Petteri Kari (Finland)

Žalgiris won 4–2 on aggregate.

15 July 2004
20:00

B68 (Faroe Islands)	0–3	(Latvia) Ventspils
	Report	Rimkus 5', 24', 65'

Svangaskarð, Toftir
Attendance: 279
Referee: Iain Robertson Brines (Scotland)
29 July 2004
17:00

Ventspils (Latvia)	8–0	(Faroe Islands) B68
Bička 7'; Stukalinas 33'; Rimkus 43'; Rekhviashvili 47'; Smirnovs 56'; Butriks 71'; Krohmer 85'; Agafonov 88'	Report

Ventspils Olimpiskais Stadions, Ventspils
Attendance: 461
Referee: Ferenc Bede (Hungary)

Ventspils won 11–0 on aggregate.

15 July 2004
18:00

Haka (Finland)	2–1	(Luxembourg) Etzella Ettelbruck
Nenonen 2', 19'	Report	Grettnich 25' (pen.)

Tehtaan kenttä, Valkeakoski
Attendance: 1,300
Referee: Rusmir Mrković (Bosnia and Herzegovina)
29 July 2004
18:00

Etzella Ettelbruck (Luxembourg)	1–3	(Finland) Haka
Mischo 1'	Report	Ristilä 10'; Terehhov 47'; Innanen 64'

Stade Am Deich, Ettelbruck
Attendance: 958
Referee: Lassin Isaksen (Faroe Islands)

Haka won 5–2 on aggregate.

15 July 2004
17:00

Ekranas (Lithuania)	1–0	(Luxembourg) F91 Dudelange
Gardzijauskas 38'	Report

Aukštaitija Stadium, Panevėžys
Attendance: 2,209
Referee: Egill Mar Markusson (Iceland)
29 July 2004
18:00

F91 Dudelange (Luxembourg)	1–2	(Lithuania) Ekranas
Mouny 86'	Report	Savenas 6'; Majus 50'

Stade Jos Nosbaum, Dudelange
Attendance: 1,030
Referee: Hristo Ristoskov (Bulgaria)

Ekranas won 3–1 on aggregate.

15 July 2004
19:30

Vaduz (Liechtenstein)	1–0	(Republic of Ireland) Longford Town
Polverino 73'	Report

Rheinpark Stadion, Vaduz
Attendance: 1,120
Referee: Merab Malaguradze (Georgia)
29 July 2004
20:00

Longford Town (Republic of Ireland)	2–3	(Liechtenstein) Vaduz
Fitzgerald 86'; Ferguson 88'	Report	Zarn 5'; Burgmeier 49'; Weller 54'

Tolka Park, Dublin
Attendance: 2,736
Referee: Ghenadie Orlic (Moldova)

Vaduz won 4–2 on aggregate.

15 July 2004
20:00

B36 (Faroe Islands)	1–3	(Latvia) Liepājas Metalurgs
Midjord 45'	Report	Soloņicins 1'; Dobrecovs 4', 63'

Tórsvøllur, Tórshavn
Attendance: 640
Referee: David McKeon (Republic of Ireland)
29 July 2004
19:00

Liepājas Metalurgs (Latvia)	8–1	(Faroe Islands) B36
Dobrecovs 2'; Katasonov 18', 30', 34', 42'; Soloņicins 29' (pen.); Lukoševičius 77'; Grebis 78'	Report	Joensen 73'

Skonto Stadium, Riga
Attendance: 2,500
Referee: Milan Šedivý (Czech Republic)

Liepājas Metalurgs won 11–2 on aggregate.

15 July 2004
21:00

Glentoran (Northern Ireland)	2–2	(Finland) Allianssi
Parkhouse 22'; Lockhart 88'	Report	Solehmainen 52'; Munoz 68'

The Oval, Belfast
Attendance: 1,873
Referee: Meir Levi (Israel)
29 July 2004
18:00

Allianssi (Finland)	1–2	(Northern Ireland) Glentoran
Munoz 39'	Report	McCallion 70'; Nixon 81'

Pohjola Stadion, Vantaa
Attendance: 1,084
Referee: Raivo Lattik (Estonia)

Glentoran won 4–3 on aggregate.

15 July 2004
21:15

ÍA (Iceland)	4–2	(Estonia) TVMK
Leósson 6'; Þórðarson 36'; Björnsson 52'; Johnsson 90'	Report	Malov 48'; Smirnov 58'

Akranesvöllur, Akranes
Attendance: 520
Referee: Attila Juhos (Hungary)
29 July 2004
17:00

TVMK (Estonia)	1–2	(Iceland) ÍA
Borissov 89'	Report	Björnsson 44', 51'

Kadriorg Stadium, Tallinn
Attendance: 65
Referee: Valery Vialichka (Belarus)

ÍA won 6–3 on aggregate.

== Second qualifying round ==
The draw for the second qualifying round was held on 30 July 2004, 14:00 CEST.

=== Seeding ===
A total of 64 teams played in the first qualifying round: 39 teams which entered in this round, and 25 winners of the first round. Prior to the draw, UEFA divided the teams into three regions, with each region containing two groups of seeded and unseeded teams in accordance with the principles set by the Club Competitions Committee. Seeding of teams within each region was based on their 2004 UEFA club coefficients.

Southern–Mediterranean Group 1		Southern–Mediterranean Group 2	
Seeded	Unseeded	Seeded	Unseeded
(Turkey) Gençlerbirliği; (Bulgaria) Levski Sofia; (Romania) Steaua București; (Slovenia) Maribor; (Israel) Bnei Sakhnin	(Croatia) Rijeka; (Serbia and Montenegro) Budućnost Banatski Dvor; (Serbia and Montenegro) Železnik; (Bosnia and Herzegovina) Modriča Maxima; (Albania) Partizani	(Croatia) Dinamo Zagreb; (Serbia and Montenegro) Partizan; (Bulgaria) CSKA Sofia; (Bulgaria) Litex Lovech; (Israel) Maccabi Petah Tikva	(Romania) Oțelul Galați; (Bosnia and Herzegovina) Željezničar; (Slovenia) Primorje; (Cyprus) AEK Larnaca; (Cyprus) Omonia
Central–East Group 1		Central–East Group 2	
Seeded	Unseeded	Seeded	Unseeded
(Czech Republic) Slavia Prague; (Czech Republic) Sigma Olomouc; (Austria) Rapid Wien; Austria Wien; (Poland) Lech Poznań; (Switzerland) Wil	(Ukraine) Illichivets Mariupol; (Russia) Rubin Kazan; (Russia) Terek Grozny; (Slovakia) Dukla Banská Bystrica; (Moldova) Nistru Otaci; (Georgia (country)) Dinamo Tbilisi	(Switzerland) Servette; (Poland) Legia Warsaw; (Poland) Amica Wronki; (Ukraine) Dnipro Dnipropetrovsk; (Russia) Zenit Saint Petersburg; (Ukraine) Metalurh Donetsk	(Austria) Superfund; (Slovakia) Artmedia Bratislava; (Hungary) Újpest; (Hungary) Honvéd; (Moldova) Tiraspol; (Georgia (country)) Tbilisi
Northern Group 1		Northern Group 2	
Seeded	Unseeded	Seeded	Unseeded
(Denmark) Brøndby; (Belgium) Beveren; (Norway) Odd Grenland; (Sweden) IF Elfsborg; (Sweden) Hammarby IF	(Latvia) Ventspils; (Lithuania) Ekranas; (Iceland) ÍA; (Liechtenstein) Vaduz; (Northern Ireland) Glentoran	(Norway) Stabæk; (Scotland) Dunfermline Athletic; (Norway) Bodø/Glimt; (Denmark) AaB; (Sweden) Östers IF	(Finland) Haka; (Latvia) Liepājas Metalurgs; (Lithuania) Žalgiris; (Iceland) FH; (Estonia) Levadia Tallinn

=== Summary ===
The first legs were played on 10 and 12 August, and the second legs on 26 August 2004.

Team 1	Agg.	Team 2	1st leg	2nd leg
Southern–Mediterranean region
Gençlerbirliği (Turkey)	2–2 (a)	(Croatia) Rijeka	1–0	1–2
Levski Sofia (Bulgaria)	8–0	(Bosnia and Herzegovina) Modriča Maxima	5–0	3–0
Bnei Sakhnin (Israel)	6–1	(Albania) Partizani	3–0	3–1
Železnik (Serbia and Montenegro)	4–5	(Romania) Steaua București	2–4	2–1
Budućnost Banatski Dvor (Serbia and Montenegro)	2–2 (a)	(Slovenia) Maribor	1–2	1–0
Željezničar (Bosnia and Herzegovina)	1–9	(Bulgaria) Litex Lovech	1–2	0–7
Dinamo Zagreb (Croatia)	4–2	(Slovenia) Primorje	4–0	0–2
Omonia (Cyprus)	2–4	(Bulgaria) CSKA Sofia	1–1	1–3 (a.e.t.)
Oțelul Galați (Romania)	0–1	(Serbia and Montenegro) Partizan	0–0	0–1
AEK Larnaca (Cyprus)	3–4	(Israel) Maccabi Petah Tikva	3–0	0–4
Central–East region
Terek Grozny (Russia)	2–0	(Poland) Lech Poznań	1–0	1–0
Slavia Prague (Czech Republic)	3–3 (a)	(Georgia (country)) Dinamo Tbilisi	3–1	0–2
Rapid Wien (Austria)	3–2	(Russia) Rubin Kazan	0–2	3–0
Illichivets Mariupol (Ukraine)	0–3	Austria Wien	0–0	0–3
Dukla Banská Bystrica (Slovakia)	4–2	(Switzerland) Wil	3–1	1–1
Nistru Otaci (Moldova)	1–6	(Czech Republic) Sigma Olomouc	1–2	0–4
Artmedia Bratislava (Slovakia)	1–4	(Ukraine) Dnipro Dnipropetrovsk	0–3	1–1
Superfund (Austria)	3–3 (a)	(Russia) Zenit Saint Petersburg	3–1	0–2
Újpest (Hungary)	5–1	(Switzerland) Servette	3–1	2–0
Metalurh Donetsk (Ukraine)	5–1	(Moldova) Tiraspol	3–0	2–1
Tbilisi (Georgia (country))	0–7	(Poland) Legia Warsaw	0–1	0–6
Amica Wronki (Poland)	1–1 (5–4 p)	(Hungary) Honvéd	1–0	0–1 (a.e.t.)
Northern region
Glentoran (Northern Ireland)	1–3	(Sweden) IF Elfsborg	0–1	1–2
Beveren (Belgium)	5–2	(Liechtenstein) Vaduz	3–1	2–1
Odd Grenland (Norway)	4–3	(Lithuania) Ekranas	3–1	1–2
Ventspils (Latvia)	1–1 (a)	(Denmark) Brøndby	0–0	1–1
Hammarby IF (Sweden)	4–1	(Iceland) ÍA	2–0	2–1
Stabæk (Norway)	6–2	(Finland) Haka	3–1	3–1
Bodø/Glimt (Norway)	3–3 (8–7 p)	(Estonia) Levadia Tallinn	2–1	1–2 (a.e.t.)
FH (Iceland)	4–3	(Scotland) Dunfermline Athletic	2–2	2–1
Žalgiris (Lithuania)	1–3	(Denmark) AaB	1–3	0–0
Östers IF (Sweden)	3–3 (a)	(Latvia) Liepājas Metalurgs	2–2	1–1

=== Southern–Mediterranean region ===
12 August 2004
19:15

Gençlerbirliği (Turkey)	1–0	(Croatia) Rijeka
Mehmet 45'	Report

Ankara 19 Mayıs Stadium, Ankara
Attendance: 5,634
Referee: Tomasz Mikulski (Poland)
26 August 2004
19:30

Rijeka (Croatia)	2–1	(Turkey) Gençlerbirliği
Erceg 13', 53'	Report	Uğur Boral 90'

Stadion Kantrida, Rijeka
Attendance: 5,102
Referee: Espen Berntsen (Norway)

2–2 on aggregate; Gençlerbirliği won on away goals.

12 August 2004
19:30

Levski Sofia (Bulgaria)	5–0	(Bosnia and Herzegovina) Modriča Maxima
Vasić 5' (o.g.); Chilikov 13', 77', 79'; Angelov 89'	Report

Georgi Asparuhov Stadium, Sofia
Attendance: 5,687
Referee: Jacek Granat (Poland)
26 August 2004
20:30

Modriča Maxima (Bosnia and Herzegovina)	0–3	(Bulgaria) Levski Sofia
	Report	Telkiyski 49'; Lucio Wagner 83', 90'

Stadion Dr. Milan Jelić, Modriča
Attendance: 300
Referee: Antonio Costa (Portugal)

Levski Sofia won 8–0 on aggregate.

12 August 2004
20:00

Bnei Sakhnin (Israel)	3–0	(Albania) Partizani
Suan 16'; Agoye 32', 54'	Report

Ramat Gan Stadium, Ramat Gan
Attendance: 1,400
Referee: Dick van Egmond (Netherlands)
26 August 2004
18:00

Partizani (Albania)	1–3	(Israel) Bnei Sakhnin
Bylykbashi 56'	Report	Agoye 21', 45'; Hamlid 72'

Qemal Stafa Stadium, Tirana
Attendance: 1,500
Referee: Pasquale Rodomonti (Italy)

Bnei Sakhnin won 6–1 on aggregate.

12 August 2004
17:00

Železnik (Serbia and Montenegro)	2–4	(Romania) Steaua București
Drinić 66'; Goulart 86'	Report	Oprita 18'; Neaga 24', 49'; Paraschiv 34'

Partizan Stadium, Belgrade
Attendance: 3,800
Referee: Knud Erik Fisker (Denmark)
26 August 2004
19:00

Steaua București (Romania)	1–2	(Serbia and Montenegro) Železnik
Dică 79'	Report	Drinić 10'; Goulart 73'

Stadionul Steaua, Bucharest
Attendance: 14,800
Referee: Michael Weiner (Germany)

Steaua București won 5–4 on aggregate.

10 August 2004
18:00

Budućnost Banatski Dvor (Serbia and Montenegro)	1–2	(Slovenia) Maribor
Milošević 22' (pen.)	Report	Beršnjak 37'; Teinović 76'

Partizan Stadium, Belgrade
Attendance: 500
Referee: João Ferreira (Portugal)
26 August 2004
19:00

Maribor (Slovenia)	0–1	(Serbia and Montenegro) Budućnost Banatski Dvor
	Report	Novaković 66'

Ljudski vrt, Maribor
Attendance: 2,500
Referee: Rob Styles (England)

2–2 on aggregate; Maribor won on away goals.

12 August 2004
17:00

Željezničar (Bosnia and Herzegovina)	1–2	(Bulgaria) Litex Lovech
Avdija 60'	Report	Hdiouad 67'; Joãozinho 73'

Stadion Grbavica, Sarajevo
Attendance: 6,730
Referee: Jaroslav Jára (Czech Republic)
26 August 2004
19:05

Litex Lovech (Bulgaria)	7–0	(Bosnia and Herzegovina) Željezničar
Joãozinho 1', 9', 36'; Tiago Silva 13'; Hdiouad 42'; Beliakov 73', 78'	Report

Lovech Stadium, Lovech
Attendance: 1,300
Referee: Tommy Skjerven (Norway)

Litex Lovech won 9–1 on aggregate.

12 August 2004
19:00

Dinamo Zagreb (Croatia)	4–0	(Slovenia) Primorje
Kranjčar 4'; Bošnjak 19'; Pranjić 28'; Zahora 69'	Report

Stadion Maksimir, Zagreb
Attendance: 6,120
Referee: Mark Halsey (England)
26 August 2004
17:30

Primorje (Slovenia)	2–0	(Croatia) Dinamo Zagreb
Mlakar 70'; Gregorič 88'	Report

Sports Park, Nova Gorica
Attendance: 900
Referee: Nicolai Vollquartz (Denmark)

Dinamo Zagreb won 4–2 on aggregate.

10 August 2004
18:00

Omonia (Cyprus)	1–1	(Bulgaria) CSKA Sofia
Kožlej 57'	Report	Mujiri 77'

GSP Stadium, Nicosia
Attendance: 13,871
Referee: Paul Mckeon (Republic of Ireland)
26 August 2004
19:30

CSKA Sofia (Bulgaria)	3–1 (a.e.t.)	(Cyprus) Omonia
Mujiri 90+3'; Sakaliev 111'; Hazurov 116'	Report	Stjepanović 78'

Balgarska Armiya Stadium, Sofia
Attendance: 6,850
Referee: Drago Kos (Slovenia)

CSKA Sofia won 4–2 on aggregate.

12 August 2004
19:00

Oțelul Galați (Romania)	0–0	(Serbia and Montenegro) Partizan
	Report

Stadionul Farul, Constanța
Attendance: 1,200
Referee: Fritz Stuchlik (Austria)
26 August 2004
19:30

Partizan (Serbia and Montenegro)	1–0	(Romania) Oțelul Galați
Radonjić 29'	Report

Partizan Stadium, Belgrade
Attendance: 5,844
Referee: Eduardo Iturralde González (Spain)

Partizan won 1–0 on aggregate.

12 August 2004
19:00

AEK Larnaca (Cyprus)	3–0	(Israel) Maccabi Petah Tikva
Isailović 18', 31', 45'	Report

GSP Stadium, Nicosia
Attendance: 1,578
Referee: Johny Ver Eecke (Belgium)
26 August 2004
18:30

Maccabi Petah Tikva (Israel)	4–0	(Cyprus) AEK Larnaca
Golan 1'; Aristocleous 24' (o.g.); Mashiach 40', 45' (pen.)	Report

Ramat Gan Stadium, Ramat Gan
Attendance: 1,000
Referee: Joseph Attard (Malta)

Maccabi Petah Tikva won 4–3 on aggregate.

=== Central–East region ===
12 August 2004
18:00

Terek Grozny (Russia)	1–0	(Poland) Lech Poznań
Khomukha 90'	Report

Lokomotiv Stadium, Moscow
Attendance: 3,160
Referee: Ivan Bebek (Croatia)
26 August 2004
20:00

Lech Poznań (Poland)	0–1	(Russia) Terek Grozny
	Report	Fedkov 81'

Stadion Miejski, Poznań
Attendance: 9,050
Referee: Haim Yaakov (Israel)

Terek Grozny won 2–0 on aggregate.

12 August 2004
19:00

Slavia Prague (Czech Republic)	3–1	(Georgia (country)) Dinamo Tbilisi
Adauto 60' (pen.); Piták 64'; Kalivoda 77'	Report	Melkadze 12'

Stadion Evžena Rošického, Prague
Attendance: 4,327
Referee: Laurent Duhamel (France)
26 August 2004
17:00

Dinamo Tbilisi (Georgia (country))	2–0	(Czech Republic) Slavia Prague
Melkadze 44'; Kankava 66'	Report

Boris Paichadze Stadium, Tbilisi
Attendance: 3,355
Referee: Bernhard Brugger (Austria)

3–3 on aggregate; Dinamo Tbilisi won on away goals.

12 August 2004
20:15

Rapid Wien (Austria)	0–2	(Russia) Rubin Kazan
	Report	Rôni 50'; Boyarintsev 64'

Gerhard Hanappi Stadium, Vienna
Attendance: 10,800
Referee: Dejan Stanišić (Serbia and Montenegro)
26 August 2004
17:00

Rubin Kazan (Russia)	0–3	(Austria) Rapid Wien
	Report	S. Hofmann 17', 70'; Kincl 29'

Central Stadium, Kazan
Attendance: 21,800
Referee: Serge Gumienny (Belgium)

Rapid Wien won 3–2 on aggregate.

12 August 2004
18:00

Illichivets Mariupol (Ukraine)	0–0	Austria Wien
	Report

Illichivets Stadium, Mariupol
Attendance: 12,600
Referee: Paulius Malžinskas (Lithuania)
26 August 2004
20:45

Austria Wien	3–0	(Ukraine) Illichivets Mariupol
Sionko 31'; Vastić 53' (pen.), 61' (pen.)	Report

Franz Horr Stadium, Vienna
Attendance: 5,800
Referee: Martin Hansson (Sweden)

Austria Wien won 3–0 on aggregate.

12 August 2004
17:00

Dukla Banská Bystrica (Slovakia)	3–1	(Switzerland) Wil
Semeník 75', 79' (pen.); Jakubko 90'	Report	Nushi 71'

Stiavnicky Stadion, Banská Bystrica
Attendance: 6,210
Referee: Alexandru Tudor (Romania)
26 August 2004
20:00

Wil (Switzerland)	1–1	(Slovakia) Dukla Banská Bystrica
Zverotić 67'	Report	Semeník 61'

Hardturm, Zürich
Attendance: 1,200
Referee: Costas Kapitanis (Cyprus)

Dukla Banská Bystrica won 4–2 on aggregate.

12 August 2004
16:30

Nistru Otaci (Moldova)	1–2	(Czech Republic) Sigma Olomouc
Bursuc 51' (pen.)	Report	Hudec 54'; Babnič 84'

Stadionul Republican, Chișinău
Attendance: 2,000
Referee: Ferenc Bede (Hungary)
26 August 2004
19:00

Sigma Olomouc (Czech Republic)	4–0	(Moldova) Nistru Otaci
Vyskočil 31', 58'; Kučera 36'; Bednář 66'	Report

Andrův stadion, Olomouc
Attendance: 5,014
Referee: Alon Yefet (Israel)

Sigma Olomouc won 6–1 on aggregate.

12 August 2004
17:30

Artmedia Bratislava (Slovakia)	0–3	(Ukraine) Dnipro Dnipropetrovsk
	Report	Semochko 61'; Nazarenko 78'; Mykhaylenko 88'

Tehelné pole, Bratislava (Note: Artmedia Bratislava played their home match at Tehelné pole, Bratislava, instead of their regular stadium Štadión Petržalka, Bratislava, as it did not meet UEFA requirements.)
Attendance: 2,722
Referee: Georgios Douros (Greece)
26 August 2004
18:00

Dnipro Dnipropetrovsk (Ukraine)	1–1	(Slovakia) Artmedia Bratislava
Kostyshyn 43'	Report	Borbély 45+1'

Meteor Stadium, Dnipropetrovsk
Attendance: 6,000
Referee: Markus Nobs (Switzerland)

Dnipro Dnipropetrovsk won 4–1 on aggregate.

10 August 2004

Superfund (Austria)	3–1	(Russia) Zenit Saint Petersburg
Glieder 16' (pen.), 85' (pen.); Mayrleb 35'	Report	Kafkas 10' (o.g.)

Waldstadion, Pasching
Attendance: 4,300
Referee: Bülent Uzun (Turkey)
26 August 2004

Zenit Saint Petersburg (Russia)	2–0	(Austria) Superfund
Vještica 10'; Kerzhakov 18'	Report

Petrovsky Stadium, Saint Petersburg
Attendance: 20,000
Referee: Stéphane Bré (France)

3–3 on aggregate; Zenit Saint Petersburg won on away goals.

12 August 2004
20:00

Újpest (Hungary)	3–1	(Switzerland) Servette
Polonkai 42'; Rajczi 56'; Tóth 63'	Report	Alicarte 58' (pen.)

Ferenc Puskás Stadium, Budapest
Attendance: 3,136
Referee: Jonas Eriksson (Sweden)
26 August 2004
20:00

Servette (Switzerland)	0–2	(Hungary) Újpest
	Report	Bükszegi 82'; Feczesin 90'

Stade de Genève, Geneva
Attendance: 5,680
Referee: Ceri Richards (Wales)

Újpest won 5–1 on aggregate.

12 August 2004
18:00

Metalurh Donetsk (Ukraine)	3–0	(Moldova) Tiraspol
Touré 30'; Stolica 74', 90+3'	Report

Shakhtar Stadium, Donetsk
Attendance: 7,000
Referee: Kenny Clark (Scotland)
26 August 2004
19:00

Tiraspol (Moldova)	1–2	(Ukraine) Metalurh Donetsk
Corneencov 29'	Report	Checher 53'; Mendoza 88'

Sheriff Stadium, Tiraspol
Attendance: 7,000
Referee: Siarhei Shmolik (Belarus)

Metalurh Donetsk won 5–1 on aggregate.

12 August 2004
16:00

Tbilisi (Georgia (country))	0–1	(Poland) Legia Warsaw
	Report	Sokołowski 77'

Boris Paichadze Stadium, Tbilisi
Attendance: 4,000
Referee: Jörg Keßler (Germany)
26 August 2004
17:00

Legia Warsaw (Poland)	6–0	(Georgia (country)) Tbilisi
Włodarczyk 5' (pen.), 44', 51'; Magiera 23'; Saganowski 80'; Sokołowski 84'	Report

Polish Army Stadium, Warsaw
Attendance: 3,371
Referee: Ionica Serea (Romania)

Legia Warsaw won 7–0 on aggregate.

12 August 2004
20:00

Amica Wronki (Poland)	1–0	(Hungary) Honvéd
Kryszałowicz 23'	Report

Stadion Amica, Wronki
Attendance: 1,100
Referee: Sergei Shebek (Ukraine)
26 August 2004
19:45

Honvéd (Hungary)	1–0 (a.e.t.)	(Poland) Amica Wronki
Takács 46'	Report
Penalties
Vén (penalty scored); Herczeg (penalty scored); Vadócz (penalty scored); Takács (penalty scored); Drobnjak (penalty missed)	4–5	(penalty scored) Kryszałowicz; (penalty scored) Dembiński; (penalty scored) Grzybowski; (penalty scored) Burkhardt; (penalty scored) Dudka

Üllői úti stadion, Budapest
Attendance: 1,000
Referee: Tony Asumaa (Finland)

1–1 on aggregate; Amica Wronki won 5–4 on penalties.

=== Northern region ===
12 August 2004
20:00

Glentoran (Northern Ireland)	0–1	(Sweden) IF Elfsborg
	Report	Alexandersson 88'

The Oval, Belfast
Attendance: 2,640
Referee: Vitaliy Hodulian (Ukraine)
26 August 2004
19:30

IF Elfsborg (Sweden)	2–1	(Northern Ireland) Glentoran
Klarström 45'; Alexandersson 78'	Report	Halliday 28'

Ryavallen, Borås
Attendance: 1,515
Referee: Stanislav Sukhina (Russia)

IF Elfsborg won 3–1 on aggregate.

12 August 2004
20:00

Beveren (Belgium)	3–1	(Liechtenstein) Vaduz
Tokpa 22'; Romaric 26'; Né 65'	Report	Zarn 56'

Freethiel Stadion, Beveren
Attendance: 2,590
Referee: Raivo Lattik (Estonia)
26 August 2004
19:00

Vaduz (Liechtenstein)	1–2	(Belgium) Beveren
Zarn 78'	Report	Djiré 32'; Romaric 56'

Rheinpark Stadion, Vaduz
Attendance: 1,050
Referee: Novo Panić (Bosnia and Herzegovina)

Beveren won 5–2 on aggregate.

12 August 2004
19:00

Odd Grenland (Norway)	3–1	(Lithuania) Ekranas
Occéan 46', 78'; Rambekk 66'	Report	Lukšys 38'

Odd Stadion, Skien
Attendance: 2,097
Referee: Dejan Delević (Serbia and Montenegro)
26 August 2004
16:30

Ekranas (Lithuania)	2–1	(Norway) Odd Grenland
Kavaliauskas 9'; Paulauskas 30'	Report	Knutsen 90'

Aukštaitija Stadium, Panevėžys
Attendance: 1,529
Referee: Darko Čeferin (Slovenia)

Odd Grenland won 4–3 on aggregate.

12 August 2004
18:00

Ventspils (Latvia)	0–0	(Denmark) Brøndby
	Report

Ventspils Olimpiskais Stadions, Ventspils
Attendance: 1,870
Referee: Edo Trivković (Croatia)
26 August 2004
20:15

Brøndby (Denmark)	1–1	(Latvia) Ventspils
Johansen 33' (pen.)	Report	Agafonov 5'

Brøndby Stadium, Brøndbyvester
Attendance: 10,320
Referee: Paolo Bertini (Italy)

1–1 on aggregate; Ventspils won on away goals.

12 August 2004
20:45

Hammarby IF (Sweden)	2–0	(Iceland) ÍA
Runström 7'; Östlund 84'	Report

Råsunda Stadium, Solna
Attendance: 6,137
Referee: Michael McCurry (Scotland)
26 August 2004
19:00

ÍA (Iceland)	1–2	(Sweden) Hammarby IF
Sveinsson 38'	Report	Brewah 18'; Andersson 45'

Akranesvöllur, Akranes
Attendance: 625
Referee: Anton Stredák (Slovakia)

Hammarby IF won 4–1 on aggregate.

12 August 2004
19:00

Stabæk (Norway)	3–1	(Finland) Haka
Gunnarsson 50'; Markegård 53'; Olsen 90'	Report	Popovitch 49'

Ullevaal Stadion, Oslo
Attendance: 1,240
Referee: Nicole Petignat (Switzerland)
26 August 2004
18:00

Haka (Finland)	1–3	(Norway) Stabæk
Ristilä 31' (pen.)	Report	Wowoah 2', 36'; Stenersen 61'

Tehtaan kenttä, Valkeakoski
Attendance: 1,346
Referee: Romāns Lajuks (Latvia)

Stabæk won 6–2 on aggregate.

12 August 2004
20:00

Bodø/Glimt (Norway)	2–1	(Estonia) Levadia Tallinn
Johansen 1' (pen.); Berg 77' (pen.)	Report	Voskoboinikov 9'

Aspmyra Stadion, Bodø
Attendance: 3,090
Referee: Anton Genov (Bulgaria)
26 August 2004
17:00

Levadia Tallinn (Estonia)	2–1 (a.e.t.)	(Norway) Bodø/Glimt
Voskoboinikov 17'; Vassiljev 45'	Report	Ludvigsen 90+3'
Penalties
Nahk (penalty scored); Vassiljev (penalty scored); Hohlov-Simson (penalty scored); Dmitrijev (penalty scored); Čepauskas (penalty scored); Šišov (penalty scored); Arbeiter (penalty scored); Dovydenas (penalty missed)	7–8	(penalty scored) Brekke; (penalty scored) Hanssen; (penalty scored) Berg; (penalty scored) Hansen; (penalty scored) Ludvigsen; (penalty scored) Bjørkan; (penalty scored) Vatshaug; (penalty scored) Steinbakk

Kadriorg Stadium, Tallinn
Attendance: 2,000
Referee: Sašo Lazarevski (Macedonia)

3–3 on aggregate; Bodø/Glimt won 8–7 on penalties.

12 August 2004
22:00

FH (Iceland)	2–2	(Scotland) Dunfermline Athletic
Garðarsson 19'; Borgvardt 22'	Report	Brewster 72'; Skerla 87'

Laugardalsvöllur, Reykjavík
Attendance: 2,005
Referee: Attila Hanacsek (Hungary)
26 August 2004
20:45

Dunfermline Athletic (Scotland)	1–2	(Iceland) FH
Dempsey 72'	Report	Björnsson 82'; Nielsen 90'

East End Park, Dunfermline
Attendance: 6,989
Referee: Jouni Hyytiä (Finland)

FH won 4–3 on aggregate.

12 August 2004
20:05

Žalgiris (Lithuania)	1–3	(Denmark) AaB
Kauspadas 34' (pen.)	Report	Nielsen 46', 49'; Lundberg 74'

Žalgiris Stadium, Vilnius
Attendance: 1,579
Referee: Emil Bozinovski (Macedonia)
26 August 2004
19:00

AaB (Denmark)	0–0	(Lithuania) Žalgiris
	Report

Aalborg Stadion, Aalborg
Attendance: 7,081
Referee: Fernando Carmona Méndez (Spain)

AaB won 3–1 on aggregate.

12 August 2004
19:00

Östers IF (Sweden)	2–2	(Latvia) Liepājas Metalurgs
Cederqvist 23', 85'	Report	Katasonov 36'; Dobrecovs 90'

Värendsvallen, Växjö
Attendance: 1,451
Referee: David Malcolm (Northern Ireland)
26 August 2004
18:00

Liepājas Metalurgs (Latvia)	1–1	(Sweden) Östers IF
Danilovs 53'	Report	Cederqvist 29'

Daugava Stadium, Liepāja
Attendance: 2,700
Referee: Kristinn Jakobsson (Iceland)

3–3 on aggregate; Liepājas Metalurgs won on away goals.
