= 2004–05 UEFA Cup first round =

The first round of the 2004–05 UEFA Cup began on 13 September 2004, which narrowed clubs down to 40 teams in preparation for the group stage.

All times are CET, as listed by UEFA.

== Teams ==
The following 80 teams participated in the first round.

Key to colours
Winners of first round advanced to group stage

First round participants

Team	Notes	Coeff.
(Italy) Lazio		83.531
(Italy) Parma		66.531
(Netherlands) Feyenoord		65.246
(England) Newcastle United		61.510
(Greece) AEK Athens		51.467
(Germany) VfB Stuttgart		47.331
(Belgium) Club Brugge		43.324
(Scotland) Rangers		42.601
(Spain) Villarreal		42.351
(Greece) PAOK		41.467
(Italy) Udinese		38.531
(France) Auxerre		34.947
(Germany) Schalke 04		34.331
(Portugal) Sporting CP		33.970
(Spain) Zaragoza		33.351
(Turkey) Beşiktaş		32.656
(Poland) Wisła Kraków		31.177
(Portugal) Benfica		29.970
(France) Lille		27.947
(Spain) Athletic Bilbao		26.351

Team	Notes	Coeff.
(Spain) Sevilla		26.351
(Croatia) Dinamo Zagreb		25.734
(Switzerland) Basel		25.384
(France) Sochaux		24.947
(Turkey) Gençlerbirliği		23.656
(Serbia and Montenegro) Red Star Belgrade		21.654
(Bulgaria) Levski Sofia		21.599
(England) Millwall		20.510
(England) Middlesbrough		20.510
(Netherlands) Utrecht		20.246
(Poland) Legia Warsaw		20.177
(Austria) GAK		19.971
(Israel) Maccabi Haifa		19.012
(Serbia and Montenegro) Partizan		18.654
(Romania) Steaua București		17.880
(Scotland) Heart of Midlothian		17.601
(Netherlands) Heerenveen		17.246
(Germany) Alemannia Aachen		16.331
(Germany) VfL Bochum		16.331
(Poland) Amica Wronki		16.177

Team	Notes	Coeff.
(Portugal) Marítimo		15.970
(France) Châteauroux		15.947
(Bulgaria) CSKA Sofia		15.599
(Greece) Panionios		15.467
(Ukraine) Dnipro Dnipropetrovsk		14.301
(Portugal) Nacional		13.970
(Portugal) Braga		13.970
(Czech Republic) Sigma Olomouc		13.915
(Hungary) Ferencváros		13.045
(Austria) Rapid Wien		12.971
(Romania) Dinamo București		12.880
(Bulgaria) Litex Lovech		12.599
(Belgium) Standard Liège		12.529
(Turkey) Trabzonspor		11.656
(Greece) Egaleo		11.467
(Netherlands) AZ		11.246
(Norway) Stabæk		11.227
(Czech Republic) Baník Ostrava		10.915
(Russia) Zenit Saint Petersburg		9.572
(Belgium) Beveren		9.529

Team	Notes	Coeff.
(Ukraine) Metalurh Donetsk		9.301
(Norway) Odd Grenland		9.227
Austria Wien		8.971
(Sweden) Djurgårdens IF		8.516
(Norway) Bodø/Glimt		8.227
(Slovenia) Maribor		7.024
(Israel) Bnei Sakhnin		7.012
(Israel) Maccabi Petah Tikva		7.012
(Russia) Terek Grozny		6.572
(Denmark) AaB		5.758
(Sweden) IF Elfsborg		5.516
(Sweden) Hammarby IF		5.516
(Hungary) Újpest		5.045
(Slovakia) Dukla Banská Bystrica		4.234
(Slovenia) HIT Gorica		3.024
(Latvia) Liepājas Metalurgs		1.979
(Latvia) Ventspils		1.979
(Georgia (country)) Dinamo Tbilisi		1.649
(Iceland) FH		1.099
(Republic of Ireland) Shelbourne		1.044

Notes

1. ^{Q2} Winners from the second qualifying round
2. ^{CL} Losers from the Champions League third qualifying round
3. ^{IC} Teams qualified via the Intertoto Cup

== Seeding ==
The 80 teams were split into eight groups of ten teams; five seeded teams and five unseeded teams.

Group 1		Group 2		Group 3		Group 4	
Seeded	Unseeded	Seeded	Unseeded	Seeded	Unseeded	Seeded	Unseeded
(Italy) Lazio; (Turkey) Beşiktaş; (France) Lille; (Austria) GAK; (Scotland) Heart of Midlothian	(Portugal) Braga; (Bulgaria) Litex Lovech; (Ukraine) Metalurh Donetsk; (Norway) Bodø/Glimt; (Republic of Ireland) Shelbourne	(Italy) Parma; (Spain) Zaragoza; (Portugal) Benfica; (Poland) Legia Warsaw; (Serbia and Montenegro) Partizan	(Czech Republic) Sigma Olomouc; (Romania) Dinamo București; Austria Wien; (Slovenia) Maribor; (Slovakia) Dukla Banská Bystrica	(England) Newcastle United; (Portugal) Sporting CP; (Poland) Wisła Kraków; (Netherlands) Utrecht; (Romania) Steaua București	(Bulgaria) CSKA Sofia; (Austria) Rapid Wien; (Sweden) Djurgårdens IF; (Israel) Bnei Sakhnin; (Georgia (country)) Dinamo Tbilisi	(Netherlands) Feyenoord; (Germany) Schalke 04; (Switzerland) Basel; (England) Millwall; (Israel) Maccabi Haifa	(Ukraine) Dnipro Dnipropetrovsk; (Hungary) Ferencváros; (Norway) Odd Grenland; (Russia) Terek Grozny; (Latvia) Liepājas Metalurgs
Group 5		Group 6		Group 7		Group 8	
Seeded	Unseeded	Seeded	Unseeded	Seeded	Unseeded	Seeded	Unseeded
(Greece) AEK Athens; (France) Auxerre; (Spain) Sevilla; (Serbia and Montenegro) Red Star Belgrade; (Germany) VfL Bochum	(Portugal) Nacional; (Belgium) Standard Liège; (Russia) Zenit Saint Petersburg; (Denmark) AaB; (Slovenia) HIT Gorica	(Germany) VfB Stuttgart; (Italy) Udinese; (Spain) Athletic Bilbao; (Bulgaria) Levski Sofia; (Netherlands) Heerenveen	(Greece) Panionios; (Turkey) Trabzonspor; (Belgium) Beveren; (Israel) Maccabi Petah Tikva; (Hungary) Újpest	(Belgium) Club Brugge; (Greece) PAOK; (Croatia) Dinamo Zagreb; (England) Middlesbrough; (Germany) Alemannia Aachen	(France) Châteauroux; (Netherlands) AZ; (Czech Republic) Baník Ostrava; (Sweden) IF Elfsborg; (Iceland) FH	(Scotland) Rangers; (Spain) Villarreal; (France) Sochaux; (Turkey) Gençlerbirliği; (Poland) Amica Wronki	(Portugal) Marítimo; (Greece) Egaleo; (Norway) Stabæk; (Sweden) Hammarby IF; (Latvia) Ventspils

== Summary ==
Team 1	Agg.	Team 2	1st leg	2nd leg
GAK (Austria)	5–1	(Bulgaria) Litex Lovech	5–0	0–1
Metalurh Donetsk (Ukraine)	0–6	(Italy) Lazio	0–3	0–3
Bodø/Glimt (Norway)	1–2	(Turkey) Beşiktaş	1–1	0–1
Shelbourne (Republic of Ireland)	2–4	(France) Lille	2–2	0–2
Heart of Midlothian (Scotland)	5–3	(Portugal) Braga	3–1	2–2
Austria Wien	4–1	(Poland) Legia Warsaw	1–0	3–1
Dukla Banská Bystrica (Slovakia)	0–5	(Portugal) Benfica	0–3	0–2
Partizan (Serbia and Montenegro)	3–1	(Romania) Dinamo București	3–1	0–0
Parma (Italy)	3–2	(Slovenia) Maribor	3–2	0–0
Zaragoza (Spain)	4–2	(Czech Republic) Sigma Olomouc	1–0	3–2
Sporting CP (Portugal)	2–0	(Austria) Rapid Wien	2–0	0–0
Newcastle United (England)	7–1	(Israel) Bnei Sakhnin	2–0	5–1
Steaua București (Romania)	4–3	(Bulgaria) CSKA Sofia	2–1	2–2
Wisła Kraków (Poland)	5–5 (a)	(Georgia (country)) Dinamo Tbilisi	4–3	1–2
Utrecht (Netherlands)	4–3	(Sweden) Djurgårdens IF	4–0	0–3
Millwall (England)	2–4	(Hungary) Ferencváros	1–1	1–3
Schalke 04 (Germany)	9–1	(Latvia) Liepājas Metalurgs	5–1	4–0
Maccabi Haifa (Israel)	1–2	(Ukraine) Dnipro Dnipropetrovsk	1–0	0–2
Terek Grozny (Russia)	1–3	(Switzerland) Basel	1–1	0–2
Odd Grenland (Norway)	1–5	(Netherlands) Feyenoord	0–1	1–4
AaB (Denmark)	1–3	(France) Auxerre	1–1	0–2
Sevilla (Spain)	4–1	(Portugal) Nacional	2–0	2–1
HIT Gorica (Slovenia)	1–2	(Greece) AEK Athens	1–1	0–1
Standard Liège (Belgium)	1–1 (a)	(Germany) VfL Bochum	0–0	1–1
Zenit Saint Petersburg (Russia)	6–1	(Serbia and Montenegro) Red Star Belgrade	4–0	2–1
Trabzonspor (Turkey)	3–4	(Spain) Athletic Bilbao	3–2	0–2
Újpest (Hungary)	1–7	(Germany) VfB Stuttgart	1–3	0–4
Panionios (Greece)	3–2	(Italy) Udinese	3–1	0–1
Maccabi Petah Tikva (Israel)	0–5	(Netherlands) Heerenveen	Canc. (Note: Due to a general strike in Israel, the first leg was cancelled by UEFA.)	0–5
Levski Sofia (Bulgaria)	1–2	(Belgium) Beveren	1–1	0–1
Dinamo Zagreb (Croatia)	2–0	(Sweden) IF Elfsborg	2–0	0–0
FH (Iceland)	1–5	(Germany) Alemannia Aachen	1–5	0–0
Middlesbrough (England)	4–1	(Czech Republic) Baník Ostrava	3–0	1–1
Club Brugge (Belgium)	6–1	(France) Châteauroux	4–0	2–1
PAOK (Greece)	3–5	(Netherlands) AZ	2–3	1–2
Ventspils (Latvia)	1–2	(Poland) Amica Wronki	1–1	0–1
Sochaux (France)	9–0	(Norway) Stabæk	4–0	5–0
Egaleo (Greece)	2–1	(Turkey) Gençlerbirliği	1–0	1–1
Marítimo (Portugal)	1–1 (2–4 p)	(Scotland) Rangers	1–0	0–1 (a.e.t.)
Hammarby IF (Sweden)	1–5	(Spain) Villarreal	1–2	0–3

== Matches ==
16 September 2004
19:00

GAK (Austria)	5–0	(Bulgaria) Litex Lovech
Bazina 14', 51'; Kollmann 39', 43'; Pogatetz 85'	Report

Arnold Schwarzenegger Stadium, Graz
Attendance: 4,011
Referee: Tonny Kolbech Poulsen (Denmark)
30 September 2004
19:00

Litex Lovech (Bulgaria)	1–0	(Austria) GAK
Joãozinho 67'	Report

Lovech Stadium, Lovech
Attendance: 1,500
Referee: Romāns Lajuks (Latvia)

GAK won 5–1 on aggregate.

16 September 2004
19:00

Metalurh Donetsk (Ukraine)	0–3	(Italy) Lazio
	Report	Rocchi 72'; César 75'; Pandev 85'

Shakhtar Stadium, Donetsk
Attendance: 18,000
Referee: Athanassios Briakos (Greece)
30 September 2004
21:00

Lazio (Italy)	3–0	(Ukraine) Metalurh Donetsk
Liverani 10', 25'; Muzzi 22'	Report

Stadio Olimpico, Rome
Attendance: 5,990
Referee: Paulo Costa (Portugal)

Lazio won 6–0 on aggregate.

16 September 2004
21:00

Bodø/Glimt (Norway)	1–1	(Turkey) Beşiktaş
Berg 19'	Report	Hassan 86'

Aspmyra Stadion, Bodø
Attendance: 4,196
Referee: Nikolai Ivanov (Russia)
30 September 2004
19:30

Beşiktaş (Turkey)	1–0	(Norway) Bodø/Glimt
Üzülmez 45'	Report

BJK İnönü Stadium, Istanbul
Attendance: 18,600
Referee: Victor Esquinas Torres (Spain)

Beşiktaş won 2–1 on aggregate.

16 September 2004
20:00

Shelbourne (Republic of Ireland)	2–2	(France) Lille
Fitzpatrick 80', 83'	Report	Bodmer 20'; Landrin 45'

Lansdowne Road, Dublin
Attendance: 7,463
Referee: Costas Kapitanis (Cyprus)
30 September 2004
19:30

Lille (France)	2–0	(Republic of Ireland) Shelbourne
Ačimovič 18'; Moussilou 27'	Report

Stadium Lille Métropole, Villeneuve-d'Ascq
Attendance: 10,787
Referee: Emil Bozinovski (Macedonia)

Lille won 4–2 on aggregate.

16 September 2004
20:45

Heart of Midlothian (Scotland)	3–1	(Portugal) Braga
Webster 51'; Hartley 62'; Kisnorbo 90+1'	Report	Paulo Sérgio 63'

Murrayfield Stadium, Edinburgh
Attendance: 18,203
Referee: Anton Genov (Bulgaria)
30 September 2004
19:30

Braga (Portugal)	2–2	(Scotland) Heart of Midlothian
João Tomás 11'; Jaime Junior 75'	Report	De Vries 27', 47'

Estádio Municipal de Braga, Braga
Attendance: 13,000
Referee: Anton Stredak (Slovakia)

Heart of Midlothian won 5–3 on aggregate.

16 September 2004
20:45

Austria Wien	1–0	(Poland) Legia Warsaw
Kiesenebner 83'	Report

Ernst-Happel-Stadion, Vienna
Attendance: 18,756
Referee: Vitaliy Godulyan (Ukraine)
30 September 2004
20:45

Legia Warsaw (Poland)	1–3	Austria Wien
Smoliński 84'	Report	Vachoušek 32'; Poledica 42' (o.g.); Sionko 90'

Polish Army Stadium, Warsaw
Attendance: 9,700
Referee: Nicolai Vollquartz (Denmark)

Austria Wien won 4–1 on aggregate.

16 September 2004
20:30

Dukla Banská Bystrica (Slovakia)	0–3	(Portugal) Benfica
	Report	Simão 38', 65'; Pereira 72'

Stiavnicky Stadion, Banská Bystrica
Attendance: 6,500
Referee: Matt Messias (England)
30 September 2004
21:00

Benfica (Portugal)	2–0	(Slovakia) Dukla Banská Bystrica
Zahovič 13'; Nuno Gomes 17'	Report

Estádio da Luz, Lisbon
Attendance: 8,500
Referee: Philippe Leuba (Switzerland)

Benfica won 5–0 on aggregate.

16 September 2004
20:00

Partizan (Serbia and Montenegro)	3–1	(Romania) Dinamo București
Tomić 53'; Boya 54'; Brnović 85'	Report	Dănciulescu 24'

Partizan Stadium, Belgrade
Attendance: 9,950
Referee: Knud Erik Fisker (Denmark)
30 September 2004
19:00

Dinamo București (Romania)	0–0	(Serbia and Montenegro) Partizan
	Report

Stadionul Național, Bucharest
Attendance: 14,800
Referee: Stéphane Bré (France)

Partizan won 3–1 on aggregate.

16 September 2004
21:00

Parma (Italy)	3–2	(Slovenia) Maribor
Maccarone 4', 22'; Marchionni 65'	Report	Kvas 14' (pen.); Golob 89'

Stadio Ennio Tardini, Parma
Attendance: 4,528
Referee: Stefan Messner (Austria)
30 September 2004
20:15

Maribor (Slovenia)	0–0	(Italy) Parma
	Report

Ljudski vrt, Maribor
Attendance: 4,200
Referee: Franz-Xaver Wack (Germany)

Parma won 3–2 on aggregate.

16 September 2004
21:00

Zaragoza (Spain)	1–0	(Czech Republic) Sigma Olomouc
Generelo 84'	Report

La Romareda, Zaragoza
Attendance: 21,000
Referee: Markus Nobs (Switzerland)
30 September 2004
19:00

Sigma Olomouc (Czech Republic)	2–3	(Spain) Zaragoza
Hudec 11'; Kobylík 52' (pen.)	Report	Soriano 78'; Hudec 80' (o.g.); Moreno 85'

Andrův stadion, Olomouc
Attendance: 8,764
Referee: Željko Širić (Croatia)

Zaragoza won 4–2 on aggregate.

16 September 2004
22:30

Sporting CP (Portugal)	2–0	(Austria) Rapid Wien
Tinga 60'; Liédson 83'	Report

Estádio José Alvalade, Lisbon
Attendance: 19,118
Referee: Paolo Bertini (Italy)
30 September 2004
20:45

Rapid Wien (Austria)	0–0	(Portugal) Sporting CP
	Report

Gerhard Hanappi Stadium, Vienna
Attendance: 17,200
Referee: Laurent Duhamel (France)

Sporting CP won 2–0 on aggregate.

16 September 2004
20:45

Newcastle United (England)	2–0	(Israel) Bnei Sakhnin
Kluivert 2', 42'	Report

St James' Park, Newcastle upon Tyne
Attendance: 30,221
Referee: Antonio Costa (Portugal)
30 September 2004
19:45

Bnei Sakhnin (Israel)	1–5	(England) Newcastle United
Masudi 16'	Report	Kluivert 11', 42'; Shearer 38', 52', 90'

Ramat Gan Stadium, Ramat Gan
Attendance: 11,150
Referee: Julián Rodríguez Santiago (Spain)

Newcastle United won 7–1 on aggregate.

16 September 2004
19:00

Steaua București (Romania)	2–1	(Bulgaria) CSKA Sofia
Neaga 10'; Dică 79'	Report	Yanev 28'

Stadionul Steaua, Bucharest
Attendance: 19,400
Referee: Olegário Benquerença (Portugal)
30 September 2004
16:00

CSKA Sofia (Bulgaria)	2–2	(Romania) Steaua București
Sakaliev 45+1'; Gargorov 76'	Report	Oprița 14'; Paraschiv 34'

Balgarska Armia Stadium, Sofia
Attendance: 16,780
Referee: Espen Berntsen (Norway)

Steaua București won 4–3 on aggregate.

16 September 2004
17:00

Wisła Kraków (Poland)	4–3	(Georgia (country)) Dinamo Tbilisi
Gorawski 59'; Żurawski 61'; Frankowski 63', 75'	Report	Kankava 17'; Aladashvili 25'; Kvirkvelia 82'

Stadion Miejski in Kraków, Kraków
Attendance: 4,300
Referee: Darko Čeferin (Slovenia)
30 September 2004
16:00

Dinamo Tbilisi (Georgia (country))	2–1	(Poland) Wisła Kraków
Nemsadze 59' (pen.); Kakaladze 65'	Report	Frankowski 76'

Boris Paichadze Stadium, Tbilisi
Attendance: 22,000
Referee: Kenny Clark (Scotland)

5–5 on aggregate; Dinamo Tbilisi won on away goals.

16 September 2004
19:30

Utrecht (Netherlands)	4–0	(Sweden) Djurgårdens IF
Van de Haar 3'; Tanghe 27', 89'; Van den Bergh 75'	Report

Stadion Galgenwaard, Utrecht
Attendance: 16,000
Referee: Levan Paniashvili (Georgia)
30 September 2004
20:15

Djurgårdens IF (Sweden)	3–0	(Netherlands) Utrecht
Johansson 3'; Hysén 40', 81'	Report

Råsunda Stadium, Solna
Attendance: 4,449
Referee: Fritz Stuchlik (Austria)

Utrecht won 4–3 on aggregate.

16 September 2004
20:45

Millwall (England)	1–1	(Hungary) Ferencváros
Wise 66'	Report	Lipcsei 79'

The Den, London
Attendance: 11,667
Referee: Dejan Delević (Serbia and Montenegro)
30 September 2004
21:00

Ferencváros (Hungary)	3–1	(England) Millwall
Rósa 26'; Botis 32'; Vágner 42'	Report	Wise 45+1'

Üllői úti Stadion, Budapest
Attendance: 15,229
Referee: Eric Braamhaar (Netherlands)

Ferencváros won 4–2 on aggregate.

16 September 2004
18:15

Schalke 04 (Germany)	5–1	(Latvia) Liepājas Metalurgs
Sand 20', 53', 60'; Kobiashvili 67'; Asamoah 89'	Report	Katasonov 34'

Arena AufSchalke, Gelsenkirchen
Attendance: 50,304
Referee: Martin Ingvarsson (Sweden)
30 September 2004
16:00

Liepājas Metalurgs (Latvia)	0–4	(Germany) Schalke 04
	Report	Sand 45'; Hanke 63', 75', 90'

Daugava Stadium, Liepāja
Attendance: 1,200
Referee: Dougie McDonald (Scotland)

Schalke 04 won 9–1 on aggregate.

16 September 2004
16:55

Maccabi Haifa (Israel)	1–0	(Ukraine) Dnipro Dnipropetrovsk
Colautti 31'	Report

Bloomfield Stadium, Tel Aviv (Note: Maccabi Haifa played their home match at Bloomfield Stadium, Tel Aviv, instead of their regular stadium Kiryat Eliezer Stadium, Haifa, due to UEFA ban on matches outside Tel Aviv area.)
Attendance: 4,900
Referee: Mike McCurry (Scotland)
30 September 2004
18:00

Dnipro Dnipropetrovsk (Ukraine)	2–0	(Israel) Maccabi Haifa
Mykhaylenko 34'; Rusol 77'	Report

Meteor Stadium, Dnipropetrovsk
Attendance: 14,000
Referee: Attila Hanacsek (Hungary)

Dnipro Dnipropetrovsk won 2–1 on aggregate.

16 September 2004
16:00

Terek Grozny (Russia)	1–1	(Switzerland) Basel
Fedkov 38'	Report	Giménez 57'

Lokomotiv Stadium, Moscow
Attendance: 4,000
Referee: Tommy Skjerven (Norway)
30 September 2004
20:15

Basel (Switzerland)	2–0	(Russia) Terek Grozny
Rossi 11'; Kléber 89'	Report

St. Jakob-Park, Basel
Attendance: 15,895
Referee: Georgios Douros (Greece)

Basel won 3–1 on aggregate.

16 September 2004
19:00

Odd Grenland (Norway)	0–1	(Netherlands) Feyenoord
	Report	Ono 74'

Odd Stadion, Skien
Attendance: 4,200
Referee: Tomasz Mikulski (Poland)
30 September 2004
20:30

Feyenoord (Netherlands)	4–1	(Norway) Odd Grenland
Bosschaart 5'; Kuyt 45'; Goor 73'; Kalou 90+1'	Report	Occéan 49'

De Kuip, Rotterdam
Attendance: 18,500
Referee: Andy D'Urso (England)

Feyenoord won 5–1 on aggregate.

16 September 2004
19:00

AaB (Denmark)	1–1	(France) Auxerre
Borgersen 43'	Report	Benjani 38'

Aalborg Stadion, Aalborg
Attendance: 6,084
Referee: Milan Šedivý (Czech Republic)
30 September 2004
20:45

Auxerre (France)	2–0	(Denmark) AaB
Kalou 4'; Benjani 74'	Report

Stade de l'Abbé-Deschamps, Auxerre
Attendance: 4,336
Referee: Peter Sippel (Germany)

Auxerre won 3–1 on aggregate.

16 September 2004
21:00

Sevilla (Spain)	2–0	(Portugal) Nacional
Baptista 43'; Ramos 79'	Report

Ramón Sánchez Pizjuán Stadium, Seville
Attendance: 34,285
Referee: Grzegorz Gilewski (Poland)
30 September 2004
21:00

Nacional (Portugal)	1–2	(Spain) Sevilla
Adriano 75'	Report	Darío Silva 35'; Antoñito 82'

Estádio dos Barreiros, Funchal
Attendance: 4,100
Referee: Gianluca Paparesta (Italy)

Sevilla won 4–1 on aggregate.

16 September 2004
18:30

HIT Gorica (Slovenia)	1–1	(Greece) AEK Athens
Rodić 1'	Report	Katsouranis 41' (pen.)

Nova Gorica Sports Park, Nova Gorica
Attendance: 1,400
Referee: Carlos Megía Dávila (Spain)
30 September 2004
20:30

AEK Athens (Greece)	1–0	(Slovenia) HIT Gorica
Soares 89'	Report

Georgios Kamaras Stadium, Athens
Attendance: 11,550
Referee: Pedro Proença (Portugal)

AEK Athens won 2–1 on aggregate.

16 September 2004
20:30

Standard Liège (Belgium)	0–0	(Germany) VfL Bochum
	Report

Stade Maurice Dufrasne, Liège
Attendance: 9,800
Referee: Claude Colombo (France)
30 September 2004
20:30

VfL Bochum (Germany)	1–1	(Belgium) Standard Liège
Maltritz 45+3'	Report	Curbelo 90+2'

Ruhrstadion, Bochum
Attendance: 23,356
Referee: Georgios Kasnaferis (Greece)

1–1 on aggregate; Standard Liège won on away goals.

16 September 2004
20:30

Zenit Saint Petersburg (Russia)	4–0	(Serbia and Montenegro) Red Star Belgrade
Arshavin 26', 44'; Horshkov 32'; Kerzhakov 53'	Report

Petrovsky Stadium, Saint Petersburg
Attendance: 21,000
Referee: Peter Fröjdfeldt (Sweden)
30 September 2004
19:30

Red Star Belgrade (Serbia and Montenegro)	1–2	(Russia) Zenit Saint Petersburg
Pantelić 17'	Report	Spivak 58' (pen.); Makarov 84'

Rajko Mitić Stadium, Belgrade
Attendance: 10,907
Referee: Michael Weiner (Germany)

Zenit Saint Petersburg won 6–1 on aggregate.

16 September 2004
19:00

Trabzonspor (Turkey)	3–2	(Spain) Athletic Bilbao
González 25' (o.g.); Yılmaz 28'; Karadeniz 69'	Report	Gurpegi 73'; Del Horno 80'

Hüseyin Avni Aker Stadium, Trabzon
Attendance: 9,034
Referee: Stuart Dougal (Scotland)
30 September 2004
21:30

Athletic Bilbao (Spain)	2–0	(Turkey) Trabzonspor
Ezquerro 5'; Yeste 61'	Report

San Mamés Stadium, Bilbao
Attendance: 32,000
Referee: Tom Henning Øvrebø (Norway)

Athletic Bilbao won 4–3 on aggregate.

16 September 2004
20:30

Újpest (Hungary)	1–3	(Germany) VfB Stuttgart
Nagy 62'	Report	Cacau 26', 90'; Kurányi 30'

Megyeri úti Stadium, Budapest
Attendance: 11,488
Referee: Pieter Vink (Netherlands)
30 September 2004
18:00

VfB Stuttgart (Germany)	4–0	(Hungary) Újpest
Hinkel 14'; Cacau 57', 62'; Heldt 58'	Report

Gottlieb-Daimler-Stadion, Stuttgart
Attendance: 23,000
Referee: Rob Styles (England)

VfB Stuttgart won 7–1 on aggregate.

16 September 2004
20:00

Panionios (Greece)	3–1	(Italy) Udinese
Dodd 27'; Giannopoulos 45+1', 59'	Report	Pinzi 28'

Nea Smyrni Stadium, Athens
Attendance: 5,604
Referee: Fernando Carmona Méndez (Spain)
30 September 2004
21:00

Udinese (Italy)	1–0	(Greece) Panionios
Mauri 82'	Report

Stadio Friuli, Udine
Attendance: 21,718
Referee: Michal Beneš (Czech Republic)

Panionios won 3–2 on aggregate.

22 September 2004 (Note: The Maccabi Petah Tikva v Heerenveen first leg, was originally scheduled for 22 September 2004, a week later than the other first round ties due to scheduling issues with Maccabi Tel Aviv's Champions League group stage home match against Bayern Munich. However, the first leg was later cancelled due to a general strike in Israel. As a result, what was originally the second leg, hosted by Heerenveen, became the sole match of a single-leg tie. In the match, the away goals rule did not apply.)
16:30

Maccabi Petah Tikva (Israel)	Cancelled	(Netherlands) Heerenveen
	Report

Ramat Gan Stadium, Ramat Gan
30 September 2004
18:00

Heerenveen (Netherlands)	5–0	(Israel) Maccabi Petah Tikva
Bruggink 14'; Väyrynen 19'; Hansson 56'; Sikora 71'; Selaković 81'	Report

Abe Lenstra Stadion, Heerenveen
Attendance: 16,000
Referee: Kristinn Jakobsson (Iceland)

Heerenveen won 5–0 on aggregate.

16 September 2004
18:30

Levski Sofia (Bulgaria)	1–1	(Belgium) Beveren
Telkiyski 62'	Report	Sanogo 64'

Georgi Asparuhov Stadium, Sofia
Attendance: 16,000
Referee: Jouni Hyytiä (Finland)
30 September 2004
20:30

Beveren (Belgium)	1–0	(Bulgaria) Levski Sofia
Né 45'	Report

Freethiel Stadion, Beveren
Attendance: 3,640
Referee: Serhiy Shebek (Ukraine)

Beveren won 2–1 on aggregate.

16 September 2004
20:15

Dinamo Zagreb (Croatia)	2–0	(Sweden) IF Elfsborg
Karić 6'; Bošnjak 79'	Report

Stadion Maksimir, Zagreb
Attendance: 4,985
Referee: Krzysztof Slupik (Poland)
30 September 2004
20:15

IF Elfsborg (Sweden)	0–0	(Croatia) Dinamo Zagreb
	Report

Ryavallen, Borås
Attendance: 1,616
Referee: Jaroslav Jára (Czech Republic)

Dinamo Zagreb won 2–0 on aggregate.

16 September 2004
22:30

FH (Iceland)	1–5	(Germany) Alemannia Aachen
Ar. Björnsson 87'	Report	Michalke 12', 14'; Meijer 44'; Klitzpera 89'; Plaßhenrich 90'

Laugardalsvöllur, Reykjavík
Attendance: 1,516
Referee: Ceri Richards (Wales)
30 September 2004
20:00

Alemannia Aachen (Germany)	0–0	(Iceland) FH
	Report

RheinEnergieStadion, Cologne
Attendance: 21,700
Referee: Alexandru Tudor (Romania)

Alemannia Aachen won 5–1 on aggregate.

16 September 2004
21:00

Middlesbrough (England)	3–0	(Czech Republic) Baník Ostrava
Hasselbaink 57'; Viduka 63', 80'	Report

Riverside Stadium, Middlesbrough
Attendance: 29,746
Referee: Pascal Garibian (France)
30 September 2004
20:45

Baník Ostrava (Czech Republic)	1–1	(England) Middlesbrough
Bystroň 19'	Report	Morrison 90+3'

Bazaly, Ostrava
Attendance: 15,351
Referee: Matteo Trefoloni (Italy)

Middlesbrough won 4–1 on aggregate.

16 September 2004
20:30

Club Brugge (Belgium)	4–0	(France) Châteauroux
Clement 18'; Simons 43' (pen.); Verheyen 80'; Stoica 89'	Report

Jan Breydel Stadium, Bruges
Attendance: 10,481
Referee: Edo Trivković (Croatia)
30 September 2004
20:30

Châteauroux (France)	1–2	(Belgium) Club Brugge
Chafni 24'	Report	Lange 15'; Gvozdenović 30'

Stade Gaston Petit, Châteauroux
Attendance: 8,170
Referee: Jacek Granat (Poland)

Club Brugge won 6–1 on aggregate.

16 September 2004
21:00

PAOK (Greece)	2–3	(Netherlands) AZ
Salpingidis 26'; Vokolos 31'	Report	Van Galen 18'; Landzaat 36'; Meerdink 49'

Toumba Stadium, Thessaloniki
Attendance: 9,231
Referee: Zsolt Szabó (Hungary)
30 September 2004
20:00

AZ (Netherlands)	2–1	(Greece) PAOK
Buskermolen 10'; Mathijsen 72'	Report	Salpingidis 8'

Alkmaarderhout, Alkmaar
Attendance: 7,923
Referee: Bernhard Brugger (Austria)

AZ won 5–3 on aggregate.

16 September 2004
15:30

Ventspils (Latvia)	1–1	(Poland) Amica Wronki
Rimkus 72'	Report	Gregorek 26'

Ventspils Olimpiskais Stadions, Ventspils
Attendance: 800
Referee: Martin Hansson (Sweden)
30 September 2004
18:30

Amica Wronki (Poland)	1–0	(Latvia) Ventspils
Dembiński 45'	Report

Stadion Amica, Wronki
Attendance: 1,000
Referee: Ionica Serea (Romania)

Amica Wronki won 2–1 on aggregate.

16 September 2004
20:30

Sochaux (France)	4–0	(Norway) Stabæk
Oruma 25'; Zairi 60'; Ilan 69'; Isabey 85'	Report

Stade Auguste Bonal, Montbéliard
Attendance: 10,671
Referee: Alon Yefet (Israel)
30 September 2004
19:00

Stabæk (Norway)	0–5	(France) Sochaux
	Report	Santos 26'; Zairi 35'; Ilan 76', 90'; Mathieu 81'

Ullevaal Stadion, Oslo
Attendance: 503
Referee: Ruud Bossen (Netherlands)

Sochaux won 9–0 on aggregate.

16 September 2004
19:30

Egaleo (Greece)	1–0	(Turkey) Gençlerbirliği
Barkoglou 13' (pen.)	Report

Georgios Kamaras Stadium, Athens
Attendance: 3,775
Referee: Helmut Fleischer (Germany)
30 September 2004
17:00

Gençlerbirliği (Turkey)	1–1	(Greece) Egaleo
Friesenbichler 54' (o.g.)	Report	Barkoglou 42'

Ankara 19 Mayıs Stadium, Ankara
Attendance: 5,735
Referee: Roberto Rosetti (Italy)

Egaleo won 2–1 on aggregate.

16 September 2004
21:00

Marítimo (Portugal)	1–0	(Scotland) Rangers
Manduca 30'	Report

Estádio dos Barreiros, Funchal
Attendance: 3,408
Referee: Johan Verbist (Belgium)
30 September 2004
21:00

Rangers (Scotland)	1–0 (a.e.t.)	(Portugal) Marítimo
Pršo 70'	Report
Penalties
Novo (penalty scored); Pršo (penalty scored); Arveladze (penalty missed); Thompson (penalty scored); Vignal (penalty scored)	4–2	(penalty missed) Chaínho; (penalty scored) Silas; (penalty missed) Ferreira; (penalty scored) Léo Lima

Ibrox Stadium, Glasgow
Attendance: 43,760
Referee: Vladimír Hriňák (Slovakia)

1–1 on aggregate; Rangers won 4–2 on penalties.

16 September 2004
20:15

Hammarby IF (Sweden)	1–2	(Spain) Villarreal
Runström 24'	Report	Guayre 12'; Gonzalo 23'

Råsunda Stadium, Solna
Attendance: 11,112
Referee: Dick van Egmond (Netherlands)
30 September 2004
22:00

Villarreal (Spain)	3–0	(Sweden) Hammarby IF
Guayre 9'; Font 58'; Cazorla 86'	Report

Estadio El Madrigal, Villarreal
Attendance: 8,016
Referee: Mark Halsey (England)

Villarreal won 5–1 on aggregate.
