= 2004–05 UEFA Cup =

34th season of Europe's secondary club football tournament organised by UEFA

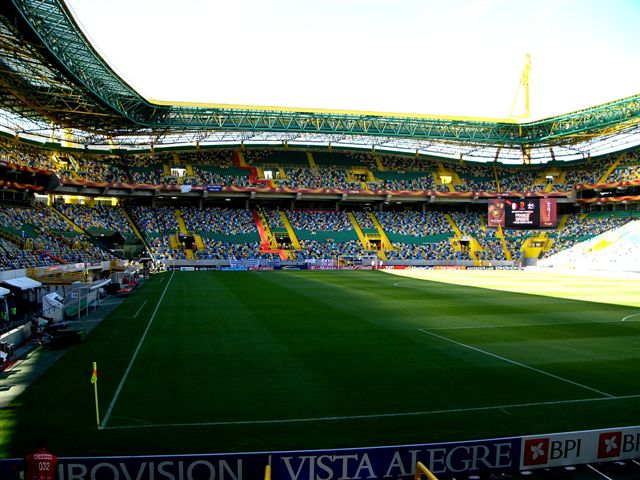
- Estádio José Alvalade in Lisbon hosted the final.

Tournament details
- Dates: 13 July 2004 – 18 May 2005
- Teams: 145

Final positions
- Champions: (Russia) CSKA Moscow (1st title)
- Runners-up: (Portugal) Sporting CP

Tournament statistics
- Matches played: 220
- Goals scored: 573 (2.6 per match)
- Attendance: 3,701,901 (16,827 per match)
- Top scorer(s): Alan Shearer (Newcastle United); 11 goals

The 2004–05 UEFA Cup was the 34th edition of the UEFA Cup. The format of the competition had changed from previous seasons, replacing that from the previous one after the abolition of the Cup Winners' Cup in 1999; an extra qualifying round was introduced, as was a group phase after the first round. The group stage operated in a single round-robin format consisting of eight groups of five teams, each team plays two games at home and two away and the top three finishers of each group progress to the knock-out round, joining the eight third-placed teams from the UEFA Champions League group stage.

The tournament was won by CSKA Moscow, coming from behind in the final against Sporting CP, in whose home stadium the match was played. It was the first win by a Russian side in any European competition. The match was refereed by Graham Poll.

Valencia were the defending champions, but were eliminated by Steaua București in the Round of 32 after dropping out of the UEFA Champions League Group Stage.

== Association team allocation ==
A total of 145 teams from 51 of 52 UEFA member associations participated in the 2004–05 UEFA Cup (the exception being Kazakhstan which had no clubs meeting licensing requirements). The association ranking based on the UEFA country coefficients was used to determine the number of participating teams for each association:

- Associations 1–6 and 16–21 each had three teams qualify.
- Associations 7–8 each had four teams qualify.
- Associations 9–15 and 22–52 (except Liechtenstein, Kazakhstan, Andorra and San Marino) each had two teams qualify.
- Liechtenstein (as they organized only a domestic cup and no domestic league), Andorra and San Marino had only one team that qualified.

Moreover, the following teams also qualified for the competition:

- 24 teams eliminated from the 2004–05 UEFA Champions League were transferred to the UEFA Cup.
- 3 teams advancing from the 2004 UEFA Intertoto Cup were transferred to the UEFA Cup.
- 3 associations had one additional team qualify via the UEFA Respect Fair Play ranking.

=== Association ranking ===
For the 2004–05 UEFA Cup, the associations were allocated places according to their 2003 UEFA country coefficients, which took into account their performance in European competitions from 1998–99 to 2002–03.

Apart from the allocation based on the country coefficients, associations could have additional teams participating in the UEFA Cup, as noted below:

- (UCL) – Additional teams transferred from the UEFA Champions League
- (IC) – Additional teams transferred from the UEFA Intertoto Cup
- (FP) – Additional berth via Fair Play ranking

Association ranking for 2004–05 UEFA Cup

Rank	Association	Coeff.	Teams	Notes
1	Spain	75.539	3	+1 (IC) +1 (UCL)
2	Italy	62.311	3	
3	England	58.340	3	
4	Germany	51.132	3	+1 (IC)
5	France	43.468	3	+1 (IC)
6	Greece	36.782	3	+3 (UCL)
7	Portugal	35.583	4	+1 (UCL)
8	Netherlands	33.498	4	+1 (UCL)
9	Scotland	30.375	2	+1 (UCL)
10	Turkey	28.991	2	+2 (UCL)
11	Belgium	28.500	2	+1 (UCL)
12	Czech Republic	27.950	2	+1 (UCL)
13	Switzerland	26.250	2	+1 (UCL)
14	Ukraine	24.583	2	+1 (FP) +2 (UCL)
15	Israel	23.999	2	+1 (UCL)
16	Austria	23.375	3	+1 (UCL)
17	Poland	21.625	3	+1 (UCL)
18	Russia	21.041	3	+1 (UCL)

Rank	Association	Coeff.	Teams	Notes
19	Serbia and Montenegro	19.831	3	+1 (UCL)
20	Norway	19.575	3	
21	Bulgaria	18.665	3	
22	Croatia	18.625	2	
23	Sweden	17.591	2	+1 (FP) +1 (UCL)
24	Denmark	17.375	2	
25	Slovakia	13.665	2	
26	Romania	12.957	2	+1 (UCL)
27	Hungary	12.790	2	+1 (UCL)
28	Cyprus	10.165	2	
29	Slovenia	9.332	2	+1 (UCL)
30	Finland	7.208	2	
31	Latvia	6.665	2	
32	Moldova	5.832	2	
33	Georgia	5.666	2	
34	Bosnia and Herzegovina	4.333	2	
35	Lithuania	3.998	2	
36	Iceland	3.498	2	

Rank	Association	Coeff.	Teams	Notes
37	Macedonia	3.497	2	
38	Belarus	3.416	2	
39	Republic of Ireland	3.331	2	+1 (UCL)
40	Malta	2.998	2	
41	Armenia	2.165	2	+1 (FP)
42	Wales	2.165	2	
43	Liechtenstein	2.000	1	
44	Albania	1.831	2	
45	Estonia	1.665	2	
46	Northern Ireland	1.498	2	
47	Luxembourg	1.332	2	
48	Faroe Islands	1.165	2	
49	Azerbaijan	1.165	2	
50	Kazakhstan	0.500	0	
51	Andorra	0.000	1	
52	San Marino	0.000	1	

=== Distribution ===
The following was the access list for this season.

Access list for 2004–05 UEFA Cup
Round	Teams entering in this round	Teams advancing from the previous round	Teams transferred from Champions League or Intertoto Cup
First qualifying round (50 teams)	2 domestic league champions from Andorra and San Marino; 21 domestic cup winners from associations 29–52 (except Kazakhstan, Andorra and San Marino); 24 domestic league runners-up from associations 25–52 (except Liechtenstein, Kazakhstan, Andorra and San Marino); 3 teams which qualified via Fair Play ranking		
Second qualifying round (64 teams)	17 domestic cup winners from associations 12–28; 9 domestic league runners-up from associations 16–24; 13 domestic league third-placed teams from associations 9–21	25 winners from first qualifying round	
First round (80 teams)	11 domestic cup winners from associations 1–11; 2 domestic league third-placed teams from associations 7–8; 5 domestic league fourth-placed teams from associations 4–8; 8 domestic league fifth-placed teams from associations 1–8 (league cup winners for France); 3 domestic league sixth-placed teams from associations 1–3 (league cup winners for England)	32 winners from second qualifying round	16 losers from Champions League third qualifying round; 3 winners from UEFA Intertoto Cup finals
Group stage (40 teams)		40 winners from first round	
Knockout stage (32 teams)		8 group winners from group stage; 8 group runners-up from group stage; 8 group third-placed teams from group stage	8 group third-placed teams from Champions League group stage

Due to the UEFA Cup title holder (Valencia) qualifying for the Champions League via their domestic league, the following changes to the access list were made:

- The cup winners of association 11 (Belgium) entered the UEFA Cup first round instead of the second qualifying round.
- The cup winners of association 25 and 26 (Slovakia and Romania) entered the UEFA Cup second qualifying round instead of the first qualifying round.

Due to the failure of any club from Kazakhstan to obtain a UEFA licence, the following changes to the access list were made:

- The cup winners of association 27 and 28 (Hungary and Cyprus) entered the UEFA Cup second qualifying round instead of the first qualifying round.

=== Teams ===
The labels in the parentheses show how each team qualified for the place of its starting round:

- TH: Title holders
- CW: Cup winners
- CR: Cup runners-up
- LC: League Cup winners
- Nth: League position
- PO: End-of-season European competition play-offs (winners or position)
- IC: Intertoto Cup
- FP: Fair play
- CL: Relegated from the Champions League
  - GS: Third-placed teams from the group stage
  - Q3: Losers from the third qualifying round

Round of 32
(Spain) Valencia^{TH} (CL GS)	(Greece) Olympiacos (CL GS)	(Turkey) Fenerbahçe (CL GS)	(Ukraine) Shakhtar Donetsk (CL GS)
(Greece) Panathinaikos (CL GS)	(Netherlands) Ajax (CL GS)	(Ukraine) Dynamo Kyiv (CL GS)	(Russia) CSKA Moscow (CL GS)
First round
(Spain) Zaragoza (CW)	(France) Auxerre (4th)	(Netherlands) Heerenveen (4th)	(Israel) Maccabi Haifa (CL Q3)
(Spain) Athletic Bilbao (5th)	(France) Sochaux (LC)	(Netherlands) AZ (5th)	(Austria) GAK (CL Q3)
(Spain) Sevilla (6th)	(France) Châteauroux (CR)	(Scotland) Heart of Midlothian (3rd)	(Poland) Wisła Kraków (CL Q3)
(Italy) Lazio (CW)	(Greece) AEK Athens (4th)	(Turkey) Beşiktaş (3rd)	(Serbia and Montenegro) Red Star Belgrade (CL Q3)
(Italy) Parma (5th)	(Greece) Egaleo (5th)	(Belgium) Standard Liège (3rd)	(Sweden) Djurgårdens IF (CL Q3)
(Italy) Udinese (7th)	(Greece) Panionios (6th)	(Greece) PAOK (CL Q3)	(Romania) Dinamo București (CL Q3)
(England) Newcastle United (5th)	(Portugal) Sporting CP (3rd)	(Portugal) Benfica (CL Q3)	(Hungary) Ferencváros (CL Q3)
(England) Middlesbrough (LC)	(Portugal) Nacional (4th)	(Scotland) Rangers (CL Q3)	(Slovenia) HIT Gorica (CL Q3)
(England) Millwall (CR)	(Portugal) Braga (5th)	(Turkey) Trabzonspor (CL Q3)	(Republic of Ireland) Shelbourne (CL Q3)
(Germany) VfB Stuttgart (4th)	(Portugal) Marítimo (6th)	(Belgium) Club Brugge (CL Q3)	(Spain) Villarreal (IC)
(Germany) VfL Bochum (5th)	(Netherlands) Utrecht (CW)	(Czech Republic) Baník Ostrava (CL Q3)	(Germany) Schalke 04 (IC)
(Germany) Alemannia Aachen (CR)	(Netherlands) Feyenoord (3rd)	(Switzerland) Basel (CL Q3)	(France) Lille (IC)
Second qualifying round
(Scotland) Dunfermline Athletic (4th)	(Israel) Maccabi Petah Tikva (3rd)	(Serbia and Montenegro) Partizan (2nd)	(Croatia) Rijeka (3rd)
(Turkey) Gençlerbirliği (CR)	Austria Wien (2nd)	(Serbia and Montenegro) Železnik (3rd)	(Sweden) IF Elfsborg (CW)
(Belgium) Beveren (CR)	(Austria) Superfund (3rd)	(Serbia and Montenegro) Budućnost Banatski Dvor (CR)	(Sweden) Hammarby IF (2nd)
(Czech Republic) Sigma Olomouc (3rd)	(Austria) Rapid Wien (4th)	(Norway) Bodø/Glimt (2nd)	(Denmark) Brøndby (2nd)
(Czech Republic) Slavia Prague (4th)	(Poland) Lech Poznań (CW)	(Norway) Stabæk (3rd)	(Denmark) AaB (CR)
(Switzerland) Wil (CW)	(Poland) Legia Warsaw (2nd)	(Norway) Odd Grenland (4th)	(Slovakia) Artmedia Bratislava (CW)
(Switzerland) Servette (3rd)	(Poland) Amica Wronki (3rd)	(Bulgaria) Litex Lovech (CW)	(Romania) Steaua București (2nd)
(Ukraine) Dnipro Dnipropetrovsk (3rd)	(Russia) Terek Grozny (CW)	(Bulgaria) Levski Sofia (2nd)	(Hungary) Újpest (2nd)
(Ukraine) Metalurh Donetsk (4th)	(Russia) Zenit Saint Petersburg (2nd)	(Bulgaria) CSKA Sofia (3rd)	(Cyprus) AEK Larnaca (CW)
(Israel) Bnei Sakhnin (CW)	(Russia) Rubin Kazan (3rd)	(Croatia) Dinamo Zagreb (CW)	
First qualifying round
(Slovakia) Dukla Banská Bystrica (2nd)	(Georgia (country)) Tbilisi (4th)	(Malta) Birkirkara (2nd)	(Northern Ireland) Portadown (2nd)
(Romania) Oțelul Galați (CR)	(Bosnia and Herzegovina) Modriča Maxima (CW)	(Malta) Marsaxlokk (CR)	(Luxembourg) F91 Dudelange (CW)
(Hungary) Honvéd (CR)	(Bosnia and Herzegovina) Željezničar (2nd)	(Armenia) Banants (2nd)	(Luxembourg) Etzella Ettelbruck (3rd)
(Cyprus) Omonia (2nd)	(Lithuania) Žalgiris (CW)	(Armenia) Shirak (3rd)	(Faroe Islands) B36 (CW)
(Slovenia) Maribor (CW)	(Lithuania) Ekranas (2nd)	(Wales) Total Network Solutions (2nd)	(Faroe Islands) B68 (3rd)
(Slovenia) Primorje (6th)	(Iceland) ÍA (CW)	(Wales) Haverfordwest County (3rd)	(Azerbaijan) Shamkir (2nd)
(Finland) Haka (2nd)	(Iceland) FH (2nd)	(Liechtenstein) Vaduz (CW)	(Azerbaijan) Qarabağ (3rd)
(Finland) Allianssi (CR)	(North Macedonia) Sloga Jugomagnat (CW)	(Albania) Partizani (CW)	(San Marino) Pennarossa (1st)
(Latvia) Ventspils (CW)	(North Macedonia) Sileks (2nd)	(Albania) Dinamo Tirana (2nd)	(Andorra) FC Santa Coloma (1st)
(Latvia) Liepājas Metalurgs (2nd)	(Belarus) Shakhtyor Soligorsk (CW)	(Estonia) Levadia Tallinn (CW)	(Sweden) Östers IF (FP)
(Moldova) Nistru Otaci (2nd)	(Belarus) BATE Borisov (2nd)	(Estonia) TVMK (2nd)	(Ukraine) Illichivets Mariupol (FP)
(Moldova) Tiraspol (4th)	(Republic of Ireland) Longford Town (CW)	(Northern Ireland) Glentoran (CW)	(Armenia) Mika (FP)
(Georgia (country)) Dinamo Tbilisi (CW)	(Republic of Ireland) Bohemians (2nd)		

Notes

1. Slovenia (SVN): league runners-up Olimpija Ljubljana failed to obtain UEFA licence, as did another two club by table position. UEFA Cup spot was then given to 6th-placed Primorje.
2. Moldova (MDA): Moldovan Cup winners Zimbru Chișinău failed to obtain UEFA licence and were replaced by league 4th-placed club FC Tiraspol.
3. Georgia (GEO): league runners-up Sioni Bolnisi were banned by UEFA due to crowd violence in the domestic season's final match and were replaced by 4th-placed FC Tbilisi.
4. Kazakhstan (KAZ): 2003 Kazakhstan Premier League runners-up Tobol and 2003 Cup winners Kairat failed to obtain UEFA licences, along with all other Kazakhstani clubs, therefore Kazakhstan was not represented in Europe in 2004–05 season.

== Round and draw dates ==
The schedule of the competition was as follows.

Schedule for 2004–05 UEFA Cup
Phase	Round	Draw date	First leg	Second leg
Qualifying	First qualifying round	25 June 2004	15 July 2004	29 July 2004
Qualifying	Second qualifying round	30 July 2004	12 August 2004	26 August 2004
First round		27 August 2004	16 September 2004	30 September 2004
Group stage	Matchday 1	5 October 2004	21 October 2004	
Group stage	Matchday 2	5 October 2004	4 November 2004	
Group stage	Matchday 3	5 October 2004	25 November 2004	
Group stage	Matchday 4	5 October 2004	1–2 December 2004	
Group stage	Matchday 5	5 October 2004	15–16 December 2004	
Knockout stage	Round of 32	17 December 2004	16–17 February 2005	24 February 2005
Knockout stage	Round of 16	17 December 2004	10 March 2005	16–17 March 2005
Knockout stage	Quarter-finals	18 March 2005	7 April 2005	14 April 2005
Knockout stage	Semi-finals	18 March 2005	28 April 2005	5 May 2005
Knockout stage	Final	18 March 2005	18 May 2005 at Estádio José Alvalade, Lisbon	

== Qualifying rounds ==
=== First qualifying round ===
The first legs were played on 13 and 15 July, and the second legs on 27 and 29 July 2004.

Team 1	Agg.	Team 2	1st leg	2nd leg
Southern–Mediterranean region
Sileks (North Macedonia)	1–2	(Slovenia) Maribor	0–1	1–1
Marsaxlokk (Malta)	0–3 (Note: Order of legs reversed after original draw.)	(Slovenia) Primorje	0–1	0–2
Pennarossa (San Marino)	1–9	(Bosnia and Herzegovina) Željezničar	1–5	0–4
Oțelul Galați (Romania)	8–1	(Albania) Dinamo Tirana	4–0	4–1
FC Santa Coloma (Andorra)	0–4	(Bosnia and Herzegovina) Modriča Maxima	0–1	0–3
Omonia (Cyprus)	8–1	(North Macedonia) Sloga Jugomagnat	4–0	4–1
Partizani (Albania)	5–4	(Malta) Birkirkara	4–2	1–2
Central–East region
Illichivets Mariupol (Ukraine)	4–0	(Armenia) Banants	2–0	2–0
Tbilisi (Georgia (country))	5–1	(Azerbaijan) Shamkir	1–0	4–1
BATE Borisov (Belarus)	2–4	(Georgia (country)) Dinamo Tbilisi	2–3	0–1
Shirak (Armenia)	1–4	(Moldova) Tiraspol	1–2	0–2
Nistru Otaci (Moldova)	3–2	(Belarus) Shakhtyor Soligorsk	1–1	2–1
Mika (Armenia)	1–2	(Hungary) Honvéd	0–1	1–1
Dukla Banská Bystrica (Slovakia)	4–0	(Azerbaijan) Qarabağ	3–0	1–0
Northern region
Levadia Tallinn (Estonia)	3–1	(Republic of Ireland) Bohemians	0–0	3–1
Haverfordwest County (Wales)	1–4	(Iceland) FH	0–1	1–3
Östers IF (Sweden)	4–1	(Wales) Total Network Solutions	2–0	2–1
Portadown (Northern Ireland)	2–4	(Lithuania) Žalgiris	2–2	0–2
B68 (Faroe Islands)	0–11	(Latvia) Ventspils	0–3	0–8
Haka (Finland)	5–2	(Luxembourg) Etzella Ettelbruck	2–1	3–1
Ekranas (Lithuania)	3–1	(Luxembourg) F91 Dudelange	1–0	2–1
Vaduz (Liechtenstein)	4–2	(Republic of Ireland) Longford Town	1–0	3–2
B36 (Faroe Islands)	2–11	(Latvia) Liepājas Metalurgs	1–3	1–8
Glentoran (Northern Ireland)	4–3	(Finland) Allianssi	2–2	2–1
ÍA (Iceland)	6–3	(Estonia) TVMK	4–2	2–1

=== Second qualifying round ===
The first legs were played on 10 and 12 August, and the second legs on 26 August 2004.

Team 1	Agg.	Team 2	1st leg	2nd leg
Southern–Mediterranean region
Gençlerbirliği (Turkey)	2–2 (a)	(Croatia) Rijeka	1–0	1–2
Levski Sofia (Bulgaria)	8–0	(Bosnia and Herzegovina) Modriča Maxima	5–0	3–0
Bnei Sakhnin (Israel)	6–1	(Albania) Partizani	3–0	3–1
Železnik (Serbia and Montenegro)	4–5	(Romania) Steaua București	2–4	2–1
Budućnost Banatski Dvor (Serbia and Montenegro)	2–2 (a)	(Slovenia) Maribor	1–2	1–0
Željezničar (Bosnia and Herzegovina)	1–9	(Bulgaria) Litex Lovech	1–2	0–7
Dinamo Zagreb (Croatia)	4–2	(Slovenia) Primorje	4–0	0–2
Omonia (Cyprus)	2–4	(Bulgaria) CSKA Sofia	1–1	1–3 (a.e.t.)
Oțelul Galați (Romania)	0–1	(Serbia and Montenegro) Partizan	0–0	0–1
AEK Larnaca (Cyprus)	3–4	(Israel) Maccabi Petah Tikva	3–0	0–4
Central–East region
Terek Grozny (Russia)	2–0	(Poland) Lech Poznań	1–0	1–0
Slavia Prague (Czech Republic)	3–3 (a)	(Georgia (country)) Dinamo Tbilisi	3–1	0–2
Rapid Wien (Austria)	3–2	(Russia) Rubin Kazan	0–2	3–0
Illichivets Mariupol (Ukraine)	0–3	Austria Wien	0–0	0–3
Dukla Banská Bystrica (Slovakia)	4–2	(Switzerland) Wil	3–1	1–1
Nistru Otaci (Moldova)	1–6	(Czech Republic) Sigma Olomouc	1–2	0–4
Artmedia Bratislava (Slovakia)	1–4	(Ukraine) Dnipro Dnipropetrovsk	0–3	1–1
Superfund (Austria)	3–3 (a)	(Russia) Zenit Saint Petersburg	3–1	0–2
Újpest (Hungary)	5–1	(Switzerland) Servette	3–1	2–0
Metalurh Donetsk (Ukraine)	5–1	(Moldova) Tiraspol	3–0	2–1
Tbilisi (Georgia (country))	0–7	(Poland) Legia Warsaw	0–1	0–6
Amica Wronki (Poland)	1–1 (5–4 p)	(Hungary) Honvéd	1–0	0–1 (a.e.t.)
Northern region
Glentoran (Northern Ireland)	1–3	(Sweden) IF Elfsborg	0–1	1–2
Beveren (Belgium)	5–2	(Liechtenstein) Vaduz	3–1	2–1
Odd Grenland (Norway)	4–3	(Lithuania) Ekranas	3–1	1–2
Ventspils (Latvia)	1–1 (a)	(Denmark) Brøndby	0–0	1–1
Hammarby IF (Sweden)	4–1	(Iceland) ÍA	2–0	2–1
Stabæk (Norway)	6–2	(Finland) Haka	3–1	3–1
Bodø/Glimt (Norway)	3–3 (8–7 p)	(Estonia) Levadia Tallinn	2–1	1–2 (a.e.t.)
FH (Iceland)	4–3	(Scotland) Dunfermline Athletic	2–2	2–1
Žalgiris (Lithuania)	1–3	(Denmark) AaB	1–3	0–0
Östers IF (Sweden)	3–3 (a)	(Latvia) Liepājas Metalurgs	2–2	1–1

== First round ==
Team 1	Agg.	Team 2	1st leg	2nd leg
GAK (Austria)	5–1	(Bulgaria) Litex Lovech	5–0	0–1
Metalurh Donetsk (Ukraine)	0–6	(Italy) Lazio	0–3	0–3
Bodø/Glimt (Norway)	1–2	(Turkey) Beşiktaş	1–1	0–1
Shelbourne (Republic of Ireland)	2–4	(France) Lille	2–2	0–2
Heart of Midlothian (Scotland)	5–3	(Portugal) Braga	3–1	2–2
Austria Wien	4–1	(Poland) Legia Warsaw	1–0	3–1
Dukla Banská Bystrica (Slovakia)	0–5	(Portugal) Benfica	0–3	0–2
Partizan (Serbia and Montenegro)	3–1	(Romania) Dinamo București	3–1	0–0
Parma (Italy)	3–2	(Slovenia) Maribor	3–2	0–0
Zaragoza (Spain)	4–2	(Czech Republic) Sigma Olomouc	1–0	3–2
Sporting CP (Portugal)	2–0	(Austria) Rapid Wien	2–0	0–0
Newcastle United (England)	7–1	(Israel) Bnei Sakhnin	2–0	5–1
Steaua București (Romania)	4–3	(Bulgaria) CSKA Sofia	2–1	2–2
Wisła Kraków (Poland)	5–5 (a)	(Georgia (country)) Dinamo Tbilisi	4–3	1–2
Utrecht (Netherlands)	4–3	(Sweden) Djurgårdens IF	4–0	0–3
Millwall (England)	2–4	(Hungary) Ferencváros	1–1	1–3
Schalke 04 (Germany)	9–1	(Latvia) Liepājas Metalurgs	5–1	4–0
Maccabi Haifa (Israel)	1–2	(Ukraine) Dnipro Dnipropetrovsk	1–0	0–2
Terek Grozny (Russia)	1–3	(Switzerland) Basel	1–1	0–2
Odd Grenland (Norway)	1–5	(Netherlands) Feyenoord	0–1	1–4
AaB (Denmark)	1–3	(France) Auxerre	1–1	0–2
Sevilla (Spain)	4–1	(Portugal) Nacional	2–0	2–1
HIT Gorica (Slovenia)	1–2	(Greece) AEK Athens	1–1	0–1
Standard Liège (Belgium)	1–1 (a)	(Germany) VfL Bochum	0–0	1–1
Zenit Saint Petersburg (Russia)	6–1	(Serbia and Montenegro) Red Star Belgrade	4–0	2–1
Trabzonspor (Turkey)	3–4	(Spain) Athletic Bilbao	3–2	0–2
Újpest (Hungary)	1–7	(Germany) VfB Stuttgart	1–3	0–4
Panionios (Greece)	3–2	(Italy) Udinese	3–1	0–1
Maccabi Petah Tikva (Israel)	0–5	(Netherlands) Heerenveen	Canc. (Note: Due to a general strike in Israel, the first leg was cancelled by UEFA.)	0–5
Levski Sofia (Bulgaria)	1–2	(Belgium) Beveren	1–1	0–1
Dinamo Zagreb (Croatia)	2–0	(Sweden) IF Elfsborg	2–0	0–0
FH (Iceland)	1–5	(Germany) Alemannia Aachen	1–5	0–0
Middlesbrough (England)	4–1	(Czech Republic) Baník Ostrava	3–0	1–1
Club Brugge (Belgium)	6–1	(France) Châteauroux	4–0	2–1
PAOK (Greece)	3–5	(Netherlands) AZ	2–3	1–2
Ventspils (Latvia)	1–2	(Poland) Amica Wronki	1–1	0–1
Sochaux (France)	9–0	(Norway) Stabæk	4–0	5–0
Egaleo (Greece)	2–1	(Turkey) Gençlerbirliği	1–0	1–1
Marítimo (Portugal)	1–1 (2–4 p)	(Scotland) Rangers	1–0	0–1 (a.e.t.)
Hammarby IF (Sweden)	1–5	(Spain) Villarreal	1–2	0–3

== Group stage ==
Teams that have qualified for the group stage of the 2004–05 UEFA Cup
Red: Group A; Yellow: Group B; Green: Group C; Black: Group D;
Purple: Group E; Pink: Group F; Blue: Group G; Orange: Group H.
Location of Benelux teams in the 2004–05 UEFA Cup group stage

Based on paragraph 4.06 in the UEFA regulations for the current season, tiebreakers, if necessary, are applied in the following order:

1. Cumulative goal difference in group matches.
2. Total goals scored in group matches.
3. Away goals scored in group matches.
4. Higher number of UEFA coefficient points accumulated by the club in question, as well as its association, over the previous five seasons (see paragraph 6.03 of the UEFA regulations).

=== Group A ===
Pos	Team	Pld	W	D	L	GF	GA	GD	Pts	Qualification	FEY	SCH	BSL	FER	HOM
1	(Netherlands) Feyenoord	4	2	1	1	6	3	+3	7	Advance to knockout stage	—	2–1	—	—	3–0
2	(Germany) Schalke 04	4	2	1	1	5	3	+2	7	Advance to knockout stage	—	—	1–1	2–0	—
3	(Switzerland) Basel	4	2	1	1	5	4	+1	7	Advance to knockout stage	1–0	—	—	—	1–2
4	(Hungary) Ferencváros	4	1	1	2	3	5	−2	4		1–1	—	1–2	—	—
5	(Scotland) Heart of Midlothian	4	1	0	3	2	6	−4	3		—	0–1	—	0–1	—

Source: RSSSF

=== Group B ===
Pos	Team	Pld	W	D	L	GF	GA	GD	Pts	Qualification	ATH	STE	PAR	BJK	STD
1	(Spain) Athletic Bilbao	4	3	0	1	11	4	+7	9	Advance to knockout stage	—	1–0	2–0	—	—
2	(Romania) Steaua București	4	2	0	2	4	3	+1	6	Advance to knockout stage	—	—	—	2–1	2–0
3	(Italy) Parma	4	2	0	2	5	6	−1	6	Advance to knockout stage	—	1–0	—	3–2	—
4	(Turkey) Beşiktaş	4	1	1	2	7	7	0	4		3–1	—	—	—	1–1
5	(Belgium) Standard Liège	4	1	1	2	4	11	−7	4		1–7	—	2–1	—	—

Source: RSSSF

=== Group C ===
Pos	Team	Pld	W	D	L	GF	GA	GD	Pts	Qualification	DNI	ZAR	AUS	BRU	UTR
1	(Ukraine) Dnipro Dnipropetrovsk	4	3	0	1	7	5	+2	9	Advance to knockout stage	—	—	1–0	3–2	—
2	(Spain) Zaragoza	4	2	1	1	5	3	+2	7	Advance to knockout stage	2–1	—	—	—	2–0
3	Austria Wien	4	2	1	1	4	3	+1	7	Advance to knockout stage	—	1–0	—	1–1	—
4	(Belgium) Club Brugge	4	1	2	1	5	5	0	5		—	1–1	—	—	1–0
5	(Netherlands) Utrecht	4	0	0	4	2	7	−5	0		1–2	—	1–2	—	—

Source: RSSSF

=== Group D ===
Pos	Team	Pld	W	D	L	GF	GA	GD	Pts	Qualification	NEW	SOC	SCP	PAN	DTB
1	(England) Newcastle United	4	3	1	0	8	1	+7	10	Advance to knockout stage	—	—	1–1	—	2–0
2	(France) Sochaux	4	3	0	1	4	4	0	9	Advance to knockout stage	0–4	—	—	1–0	—
3	(Portugal) Sporting CP	4	2	1	1	9	3	+6	7	Advance to knockout stage	—	0–1	—	4–1	—
4	(Greece) Panionios	4	1	0	3	6	8	−2	3		0–1	—	—	—	5–2
5	(Georgia (country)) Dinamo Tbilisi	4	0	0	4	2	13	−11	0		—	0–2	0–4	—	—

Source: RSSSF

=== Group E ===
Pos	Team	Pld	W	D	L	GF	GA	GD	Pts	Qualification	MID	VIL	PTZ	LAZ	EGA
1	(England) Middlesbrough	4	3	0	1	6	2	+4	9	Advance to knockout stage	—	—	3–0	2–0	—
2	(Spain) Villarreal	4	2	2	0	8	2	+6	8	Advance to knockout stage	2–0	—	—	—	4–0
3	(Serbia and Montenegro) Partizan	4	1	2	1	7	6	+1	5	Advance to knockout stage	—	1–1	—	—	4–0
4	(Italy) Lazio	4	0	3	1	5	7	−2	3		—	1–1	2–2	—	—
5	(Greece) Egaleo	4	0	1	3	2	11	−9	1		0–1	—	—	2–2	—

Source: RSSSF

=== Group F ===
Pos	Team	Pld	W	D	L	GF	GA	GD	Pts	Qualification	AZ	AUX	GAK	RAN	AMC
1	(Netherlands) AZ	4	3	0	1	6	3	+3	9	Advance to knockout stage	—	2–0	—	1–0	—
2	(France) Auxerre	4	2	1	1	7	3	+4	7	Advance to knockout stage	—	—	0–0	—	5–1
3	(Austria) GAK	4	2	1	1	5	4	+1	7	Advance to knockout stage	2–0	—	—	—	3–1
4	(Scotland) Rangers	4	2	0	2	8	3	+5	6		—	0–2	3–0	—	—
5	(Poland) Amica Wronki	4	0	0	4	3	16	−13	0		1–3	—	—	0–5	—

Source: RSSSF

=== Group G ===
Pos	Team	Pld	W	D	L	GF	GA	GD	Pts	Qualification	STU	BEN	HVN	DZ	BEV
1	(Germany) VfB Stuttgart	4	3	0	1	10	3	+7	9	Advance to knockout stage	—	3–0	—	2–1	—
2	(Portugal) Benfica	4	3	0	1	9	5	+4	9	Advance to knockout stage	—	—	4–2	2–0	—
3	(Netherlands) Heerenveen	4	2	1	1	6	6	0	7	Advance to knockout stage	1–0	—	—	—	1–0
4	(Croatia) Dinamo Zagreb	4	1	1	2	9	7	+2	4		—	—	2–2	—	6–1
5	(Belgium) Beveren	4	0	0	4	2	15	−13	0		1–5	0–3	—	—	—

Source: RSSSF

=== Group H ===
Pos	Team	Pld	W	D	L	GF	GA	GD	Pts	Qualification	LIL	SEV	AAC	ZEN	AEK
1	(France) Lille	4	3	0	1	5	3	+2	9	Advance to knockout stage	—	1–0	—	2–1	—
2	(Spain) Sevilla	4	2	1	1	6	4	+2	7	Advance to knockout stage	—	—	2–0	—	3–2
3	(Germany) Alemannia Aachen	4	2	1	1	5	4	+1	7	Advance to knockout stage	1–0	—	—	2–2	—
4	(Russia) Zenit Saint Petersburg	4	1	2	1	9	6	+3	5		—	1–1	—	—	5–1
5	(Greece) AEK Athens	4	0	0	4	4	12	−8	0		1–2	—	0–2	—	—

Source: RSSSF

== Knockout stage ==
=== Bracket ===
Round of 32
(Greece) Olympiacos	1	1	2
(France) Sochaux	0	0	0
(Netherlands) Heerenveen	1	1	2
(England) Newcastle United	2	2	4
(Austria) GAK	2	1	3
(England) Middlesbrough	2	2	4
(Portugal) Sporting CP	2	2	4
(Netherlands) Feyenoord	1	1	2
(Spain) Valencia	2	0	2 (3)
(Romania) Steaua București (p)	0	2	2 (4)
(Ukraine) Dynamo Kyiv	0	0	0
(Spain) Villarreal	0	2	2
(Ukraine) Shakhtar Donetsk	1	1	2
(Germany) Schalke 04	1	0	1
(Germany) Alemannia Aachen	0	1	1
(Netherlands) AZ	0	2	2
Austria Wien	0	2	2
(Spain) Athletic Bilbao	0	1	1
(Turkey) Fenerbahçe	0	1	1
(Spain) Zaragoza	1	2	3
(Greece) Panathinaikos	1	0	1
(Spain) Sevilla	0	2	2
(Italy) Parma (a.e.t.)	0	2	2
(Germany) VfB Stuttgart	0	0	0
(Serbia and Montenegro) Partizan	2	1	3
(Ukraine) Dnipro Dnipropetrovsk	2	0	2
(Russia) CSKA Moscow	2	1	3
(Portugal) Benfica	0	1	1
(Switzerland) Basel	0	0	0
(France) Lille	0	2	2
(Netherlands) Ajax	1	1	2
(France) Auxerre	0	3	3

Round of 16
(Greece) Olympiacos	1	0	1
(England) Newcastle United	3	4	7
(England) Middlesbrough	2	0	2
(Portugal) Sporting CP	3	1	4
(Romania) Steaua București	0	0	0
(Spain) Villarreal	0	2	2
(Ukraine) Shakhtar Donetsk	1	1	2
(Netherlands) AZ	3	2	5
Austria Wien (a)	1	2	3
(Spain) Zaragoza	1	2	3
(Spain) Sevilla	0	0	0
(Italy) Parma	0	1	1
(Serbia and Montenegro) Partizan	1	0	1
(Russia) CSKA Moscow	1	2	3
(France) Lille	0	0	0
(France) Auxerre	1	0	1

Quarter-finals
(England) Newcastle United	1	1	2
(Portugal) Sporting CP	0	4	4
(Spain) Villarreal	1	1	2
(Netherlands) AZ	2	1	3
Austria Wien	1	0	1
(Italy) Parma (a)	1	0	1
(Russia) CSKA Moscow	4	0	4
(France) Auxerre	0	2	2

Semi-finals
(Portugal) Sporting CP (a.e.t.; a)	2	2	4
(Netherlands) AZ	1	3	4
(Italy) Parma	0	0	0
(Russia) CSKA Moscow	0	3	3

Final
18 May – Lisbon
(Portugal) Sporting CP	1
(Russia) CSKA Moscow	3

=== Round of 32 ===
Team 1	Agg.	Team 2	1st leg	2nd leg
Olympiacos (Greece)	2–0	(France) Sochaux	1–0	1–0
Heerenveen (Netherlands)	2–4	(England) Newcastle United	1–2	1–2
GAK (Austria)	3–4	(England) Middlesbrough	2–2	1–2
Sporting CP (Portugal)	4–2	(Netherlands) Feyenoord	2–1	2–1
Valencia (Spain)	2–2 (3–4 p)	(Romania) Steaua București	2–0	0–2 (a.e.t.)
Dynamo Kyiv (Ukraine)	0–2	(Spain) Villarreal	0–0	0–2
Shakhtar Donetsk (Ukraine)	2–1	(Germany) Schalke 04	1–1	1–0
Alemannia Aachen (Germany)	1–2	(Netherlands) AZ	0–0	1–2
Austria Wien	2–1	(Spain) Athletic Bilbao	0–0	2–1
Fenerbahçe (Turkey)	1–3	(Spain) Zaragoza	0–1	1–2
Panathinaikos (Greece)	1–2	(Spain) Sevilla	1–0	0–2
Parma (Italy)	2–0	(Germany) VfB Stuttgart	0–0	2–0 (a.e.t.)
Partizan (Serbia and Montenegro)	3–2	(Ukraine) Dnipro Dnipropetrovsk	2–2	1–0
CSKA Moscow (Russia)	3–1	(Portugal) Benfica	2–0	1–1
Basel (Switzerland)	0–2	(France) Lille	0–0	0–2
Ajax (Netherlands)	2–3	(France) Auxerre	1–0	1–3

=== Round of 16 ===
Team 1	Agg.	Team 2	1st leg	2nd leg
Olympiacos (Greece)	1–7	(England) Newcastle United	1–3	0–4
Middlesbrough (England)	2–4	(Portugal) Sporting CP	2–3	0–1
Steaua București (Romania)	0–2	(Spain) Villarreal	0–0	0–2
Shakhtar Donetsk (Ukraine)	2–5	(Netherlands) AZ	1–3	1–2
Austria Wien	3–3 (a)	(Spain) Zaragoza	1–1	2–2
Sevilla (Spain)	0–1	(Italy) Parma	0–0	0–1
Partizan (Serbia and Montenegro)	1–3	(Russia) CSKA Moscow	1–1	0–2
Lille (France)	0–1	(France) Auxerre	0–1	0–0

=== Quarter-finals ===
Team 1	Agg.	Team 2	1st leg	2nd leg
Newcastle United (England)	2–4	(Portugal) Sporting CP	1–0	1–4
Villarreal (Spain)	2–3	(Netherlands) AZ	1–2	1–1
Austria Wien	1–1 (a)	(Italy) Parma	1–1	0–0
CSKA Moscow (Russia)	4–2	(France) Auxerre	4–0	0–2

=== Semi-finals ===
Team 1	Agg.	Team 2	1st leg	2nd leg
Sporting CP (Portugal)	4–4 (a)	(Netherlands) AZ	2–1	2–3 (a.e.t.)
Parma (Italy)	0–3	(Russia) CSKA Moscow	0–0	0–3

=== Final ===
The final was played on 18 May 2005 at the Estádio José Alvalade in Lisbon, Portugal.

18 May 2005
19:45 UTC+1

Sporting CP (Portugal)	1–3	(Russia) CSKA Moscow
Rogério 29'	Report	A. Berezutski 56'; Zhirkov 65'; Vágner Love 75'

Estádio José Alvalade, Lisbon
Attendance: 47,085
Referee: Graham Poll (England)

== Top goalscorers ==
Rank	Name	Team	Goals	Minutes played
1	(England) Alan Shearer	(England) Newcastle United	11	766
2	(Portugal) Liédson	(Portugal) Sporting CP	8	1277
3	(Austria) Roland Kollmann	(Austria) GAK	7	551
3	(Brazil) Cacau	(Germany) VfB Stuttgart	7	750
5	(Ivory Coast) Bonaventure Kalou	(France) Auxerre	6	1038
6	(Russia) Aleksandr Kerzhakov	(Russia) Zenit Saint Petersburg	5	450
6	(Netherlands) Patrick Kluivert	(England) Newcastle United	5	452
6	(Spain) Santiago Ezquerro	(Spain) Athletic Bilbao	5	525
6	(Netherlands) Erik Meijer	(Germany) Alemannia Aachen	5	682
6	(Brazil) Júlio Baptista	(Spain) Sevilla	5	700

== See also ==
- 2004–05 UEFA Champions League
- 2005 UEFA Super Cup
- 2004 UEFA Intertoto Cup
