= Andrey Agafonov =

Russian footballer

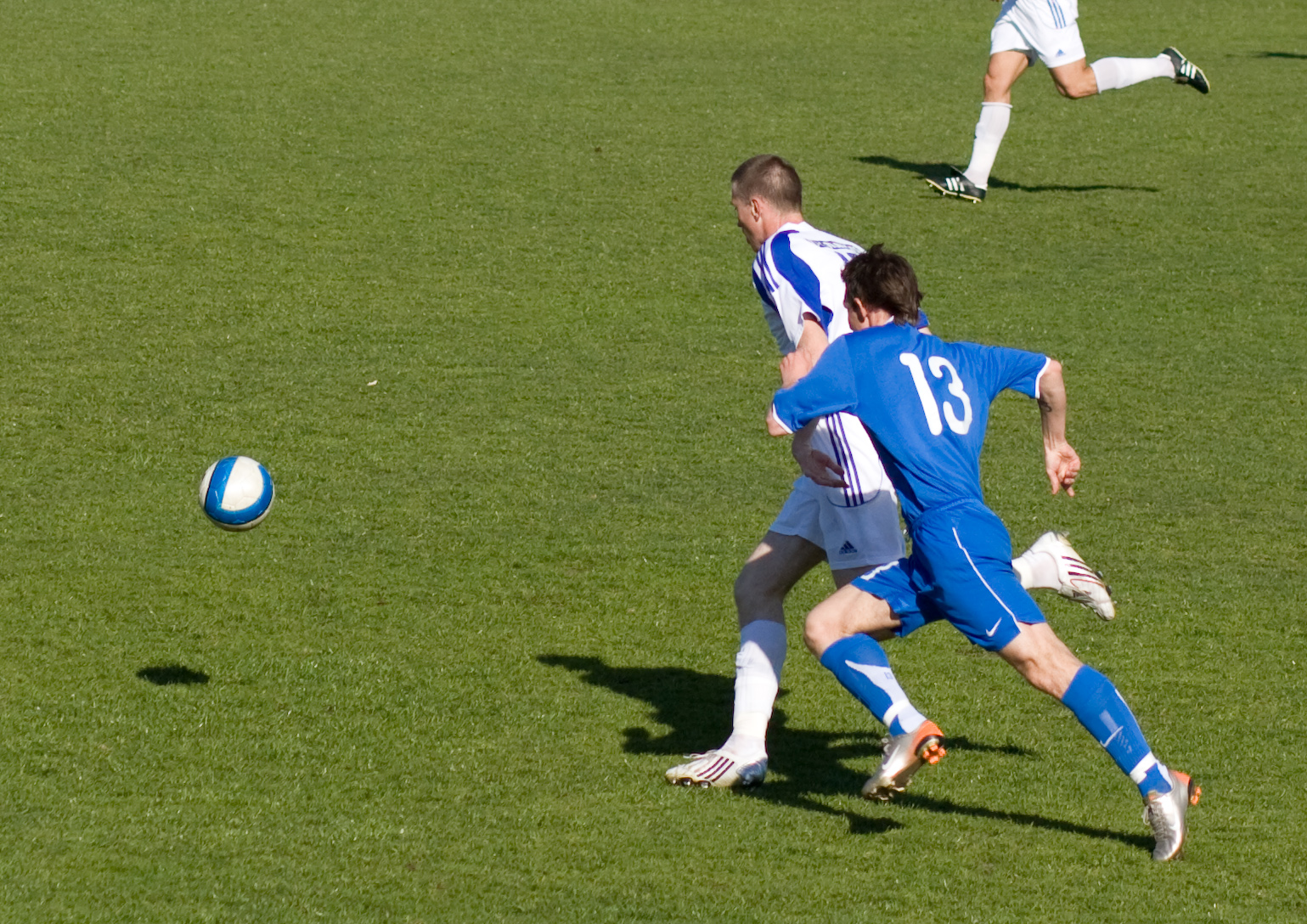
- Andrey Agafonov (#13) in FK Rīga

Personal information
- Full name: Andrey Valentinovich Agafonov
- Date of birth: 29 January 1979 (age 47)
- Place of birth: Russia
- Height: 1.77 m (5 ft 10 in)
- Position: Midfielder

Youth career
- Primorets St. Petersburg

Senior career*
Years	Team	Apps	(Gls)
1999	Degerfors IF		
2000–2005	FK Ventspils	127	(23)
2006	FC Spartak Vladikavkaz	3	(0)
2006–2008	FK Rīga	31	(6)
2008	FC Dynamo Barnaul	15	(1)
2009	Skonto FC	9	(0)
- * Club domestic league appearances and goals

Andrey Valentinovich Agafonov (Russian: Андрей Валентинович Агафонов; born 29 January 1979) is a former Russian professional footballer.

== Club career ==
He played in the Russian Football National League for FC Dynamo Barnaul in 2008.
