= Marius Zarn =

Swiss footballer and manager (born 1978)

Personal information
- Full name: Marius Zarn
- Date of birth: 18 April 1978 (age 48)
- Place of birth: Switzerland
- Height: 1.84 m (6 ft 1/2 in)
- Position: Midfielder

Senior career*
Years	Team	Apps	(Gls)
2001–2008	FC Vaduz	131	(11)
2006–2007	FC Aarau	13	(0)
2007–2008	FC Vaduz	24	(2)
2008–2012	FC Chur 97		

Managerial career
- 2010–2014: FC Chur 97
- 2014–XXXX: BFV (U15)
- * Club domestic league appearances and goals

Marius Zarn (born 18 April 1978) is a retired footballer from Switzerland who played as midfielder.

== Career ==
Zarn has spent most of his career playing for FC Vaduz, but had a brief spell in the Swiss Super League with FC Aarau.

Joining FC Chur 97 in 2008, he was appointed player-coach in 2010. He left the position in the summer 2014 after relegation. He was then immediately hired as a U15 coach at Bündner Fussballverband.

In the later years, he also worked as a youth coach at FC Triesen and head coach for FC Bad Ragaz, where he also played for the club's old boys team.
