= Alen Kurt =

Bosnian footballer

Personal information
- Full name: Alen Kurt
- Date of birth: 3 August 1974 (age 52)
- Place of birth: Sarajevo, SFR Yugoslavia
- Height: 1.88 m (6 ft 2 in)
- Position: Defender

Senior career*
Years	Team	Apps	(Gls)
1995-2001	Željezničar	138	(15)
2002	Olimpik	6	(1)
2002-2004	Žepče	57	(2)
2004-2005	Željezničar	14	(0)
2005-2006	Olimpik		

International career^{‡}
1999	Bosnia and Herzegovina	1	(0)

Managerial career
- Bosna Sarajevo
- Olimpik (youth)
- * Club domestic league appearances and goals ‡ National team caps and goals as of 19 June 2021

Alen Kurt (born 3 August 1974) is a Bosnian retired football player. He is currently a youth coach at Olimpik.

== Club career ==
He played the majority of his career for Željezničar Sarajevo and was part of the team that won the first 2000–01 Premier League of Bosnia and Herzegovina title.

== International career ==
Kurt made one appearance for Bosnia and Herzegovina, coming on as a second-half substitute for Ramiz Husić in an August 1999 friendly match against Liechtenstein.
