= Tommy Nielsen (footballer, born 1972) =

Danish footballer (born 1972)

Personal information
- Full name: Tommy Fredsgaard Nielsen
- Date of birth: 11 June 1972 (age 54)
- Place of birth: Denmark
- Position: Midfielder

Senior career*
Years	Team	Apps	(Gls)
–1997	Næstved	37	(2)
1997–1999	Aarhus Fremad	62	(4)
1999–2003	AGF	53	(3)
2003–2011	FH	154	(11)
2013–2014	Fjarðabyggð	34	(5)
- * Club domestic league appearances and goals

Tommy Fredsgaard Nielsen (born 11 June 1972) is a Danish former footballer who played as a midfielder.

== Early life ==
Nielsen was born in 1972 in Denmark. He almost attended police academy.

== Career ==
Nielsen started his career with Danish side Næstved. In 1997, he signed for Danish side Aarhus Fremad. In 1999, he signed for Danish side AGF. In 2003, he signed for Icelandic side FH. He helped the club win the league. In 2013, he signed for Icelandic side Fjarðabyggð.

== Style of play ==
Nielsen mainly operated as a defender. He was described as a "powerful defender".

== Personal life ==
Nielsen has been married. He has worked in the golf industry.
