= Milan Šedivý =

Czech football referee

- Born: 17 June 1967 (age 59); Czechoslovakia

International
| Years | League | Role |
| –2005 | FIFA listed | Referee |

Milan Šedivý (born 17 June 1967) is a Czech football referee. He was a full international for FIFA until 2005, and is known to have served as a referee in international matches in 2003.
