= Joãozinho Neto =

Brazilian footballer (born 1980)

Personal information
- Full name: João Soares de Almeida Neto
- Date of birth: 30 January 1980 (age 46)
- Place of birth: Belo Horizonte, Brazil
- Height: 1.73 m (5 ft 8 in)
- Position: Forward

Team information
- Current team: Camaçari

Youth career
- 1998: Cruzeiro
- 1999: Guarani
- 2000: Ipatinga

Senior career*
| Years | Team | Apps | (Gls) |
| 2001 | Santa Cruz | 13 | (1) |
| 2002–2004 | Cruzeiro | 10 | (1) |
| 2003 | → Recreativo (loan) | 7 | (2) |
| 2003 | → Fluminense (loan) | 21 | (1) |
| 2004 | → Juventude (loan) | 0 | (0) |
| 2004 | → Paysandu (loan) | 5 | (3) |
| 2004–2005 | Litex Lovech | ? | (?) |
| 2005–2006 | Brasiliense | 5 | (0) |
| 2006 | Portuguesa | ? | (?) |
| 2006 | Ipatinga | ? | (?) |
| 2007 | Vitória | ? | (?) |
| 2008 | Monarcas Morelia | 6 | (0) |
| 2008 | Atlético Paranaense | 8 | (1) |
| 2009 | Ipatinga | 0 | (0) |
| 2009 | Bahia | 7 | (1) |
| 2010 | América (MG) | 0 | (0) |
| 2010 | Vila Nova | 4 | (1) |
| 2011 | Ipatinga | 0 | (0) |
| 2012– | Camaçari | | |
- * Club domestic league appearances and goals

João Soares de Almeida Neto (born 30 January 1980), known as Joãozinho Neto, is a Brazilian footballer, currently playing for Camaçari Futebol Clube.

== Career ==
Joãozinho started his career at Cruzeiro, one of the biggest club of Minas Gerais. He left Brazil for Spanish side Recreativo de Huelva on 29 January 2003.

He left Brazil again for Litex Lovech on 20 July 2004. He moved back to Brazil for Brasiliense on 15 August 2005, signing a contract until the end of the 2006 season. he played for the club at 2006 Copa do Brasil before left for Portuguesa and Ipatinga.

In January 2007, he signed a one-year contract with Esporte Clube Vitória. He extended his contract for an additional year in September 2007, and he also played for the club at Copa do Brasil 2007. Joãozinho would lead Vitória to the Campeonato Brasileiro Série B title, scoring 19 goals during the season. In January 2008, he went on loan to Mexican Primera División side Monarcas Morelia.

In June 2008, he signed a 2-year contract with Atlético Paranaense. In January 2009, he left for Ipatinga.

In April 2009, he was signed by Bahia at Campeonato Brasileiro Série B.

== Personal life ==
He also known as Joãozinho Neto to avoid confusion with other his former teammate at Portuguesa, Joãozinho.
