= Aleksandr Katasonov =

Russian footballer

Personal information
- Full name: Aleksandr Mikhailovich Katasonov
- Date of birth: 10 April 1972 (age 54)
- Place of birth: Moscow, Soviet Union
- Height: 1.92 m (6 ft 4 in)
- Position: Forward

Youth career
- FC Lokomotiv Moscow

Senior career*
Years	Team	Apps	(Gls)
1993	FC Znamya Truda Orekhovo-Zuyevo	39	(15)
1994–1996	FC Lokomotiv-d Moscow	33	(9)
1994–1996	FC Lokomotiv Moscow	42	(3)
1997	FC Amkar Perm	27	(13)
1998–2000	FC Spartak-Chukotka Moscow	48	(36)
2000	FC Saturn Ramenskoye	7	(0)
2000	FC Saturn-2 Ramenskoye	5	(6)
2001–2006	Liepājas Metalurgs	154	(99)
2007	→ FK Jūrmala (on loan)		

Managerial career
- 2010–2013: FC Khimki (assistant)
- 2013–2017: FC Lokomotiv-2 Moscow (assistant)
- 2017–2019: FC Lokomotiv Moscow (U-21)
- 2019: FC Kazanka Moscow
- * Club domestic league appearances and goals

Aleksandr Mikhailovich Katasonov (Russian: Александр Михайлович Катасонов; born 10 April 1972) is a Russian professional football coach and former player.

== Career ==
In the 2005 Virslīga season he was voted as the best forward in the Virslīga. In the 2006 Virslīga season he played for Liepājas Metalurgs when they finished as runners-up in the league.

== Honours ==
- Russian Second Division Zone Center top scorer: 1999 (26 goals).

Liepājas Metalurgs

- Virsliga Champions (1):
  - 2005
- Virsliga Runners-up (3):
  - 2003, 2004, 2006
- Latvian Cup Winners (1):
  - 2006
- Virsliga Top Scorer (1):
  - 2004
